= Outline of Harry Potter =

Series of novels, and media franchise

Harry Potter is a series of fantasy novels by J. K. Rowling.

Harry Potter related topics include:

== The original books ==
The Harry Potter books are 7 novels about a boy who learns he is a famous wizard:

1. Harry Potter and the Philosopher's Stone—published as Harry Potter and the Sorcerer's Stone in the United States
2. Harry Potter and the Chamber of Secrets
3. Harry Potter and the Prisoner of Azkaban
4. Harry Potter and the Goblet of Fire
5. Harry Potter and the Order of the Phoenix
6. Harry Potter and the Half-Blood Prince
7. Harry Potter and the Deathly Hallows

== Films ==
As of 2022, there are eleven motion picture adaptions based on the world, characters and books created by J. K. Rowling. There are eight motion picture adaptations of the Harry Potter novels by J. K. Rowling; the final novel is split into two cinematic parts. While the remaining motion picture adaptions are inspired by both the companion book Fantastic Beasts and Where to Find Them as well has original content developed by JK Rowling. Seven of the eight screenplays were written by Steve Kloves. The fifth was penned by Michael Goldenberg. All three Fantastic Beasts films were written by JK Rowling. David Heyman has produced the franchise, which has seen four different directors. All eleven films are distributed by Warner Bros. In 2016, a spin-off of and prequel to the Harry Potter film series titled Fantastic Beasts and Where to Find Them was released. A sequel to Fantastic Beasts entitled Fantastic Beasts: The Crimes of Grindelwald was released in 2018. In April 2022 the third part Fantastic Beasts: The Secrets of Dumbledore was released. Two more instalments of the Fantastic Beasts series are tentatively planned for release.

- Wizarding World - The shared universe of the Harry Potter and Fantastic Beasts film series
- Harry Potter (film series)
  - List of Harry Potter cast members
  - Directed by Chris Columbus:
    - Harry Potter and the Philosopher's Stone (film) (known in the United States as "Harry Potter and the Sorcerer's Stone")
    - Harry Potter and the Chamber of Secrets (film)
  - Directed by Alfonso Cuarón:
    - Harry Potter and the Prisoner of Azkaban (film)
  - Directed by Mike Newell:
    - Harry Potter and the Goblet of Fire (film)
  - Directed by David Yates:
    - Harry Potter and the Order of the Phoenix (film)
    - Harry Potter and the Half-Blood Prince (film)
    - Harry Potter and the Deathly Hallows – Part 1
    - Harry Potter and the Deathly Hallows – Part 2
      - Production of Harry Potter and the Deathly Hallows
- Fantastic Beasts (film series)
  - List of Fantastic Beasts cast members
  - List of Fantastic Beasts characters
  - Directed by David Yates:
    - Fantastic Beasts and Where to Find Them (film)
    - Fantastic Beasts: The Crimes of Grindelwald
    - Fantastic Beasts: The Secrets of Dumbledore

=== Music ===
- Music of the Harry Potter films
  - Harry Potter and the Philosopher's Stone soundtrack
  - Harry Potter and the Chamber of Secrets soundtrack
  - Harry Potter and the Prisoner of Azkaban soundtrack
  - Harry Potter and the Goblet of Fire soundtrack
  - Harry Potter and the Order of the Phoenix soundtrack
  - Harry Potter and the Half-Blood Prince soundtrack
  - Harry Potter and the Deathly Hallows – Part 1 soundtrack
  - Harry Potter and the Deathly Hallows – Part 2 soundtrack
- Music of the Fantastic Beasts films
  - Fantastic Beasts and Where to Find Them soundtrack
  - Fantastic Beasts: The Crimes of Grindelwald soundtrack

== Other works ==
- Wizarding World Digital
- Harry Potter and the Cursed Child
- Harry Potter 20th Anniversary: Return to Hogwarts
- Secondary books
  - Fantastic Beasts and Where to Find Them
  - Quidditch Through the Ages
  - The Tales of Beedle the Bard
- Short stories
  - Prequel
  - Hogwarts: An Incomplete and Unreliable Guide
  - Short Stories from Hogwarts of Power, Politics and Pesky Poltergeists
  - Short Stories from Hogwarts of Heroism, Hardship and Dangerous Hobbies

== Video games ==
- Harry Potter video games

- Lego Creator: Harry Potter
- The Philosopher's Stone
- The Chamber of Secrets
- Creator: Harry Potter and the Chamber of Secrets
- Quidditch World Cup
- The Prisoner of Azkaban
- The Goblet of Fire
- The Order of the Phoenix
- The Half-Blood Prince
- Lego Harry Potter: Years 1–4

- The Deathly Hallows – Part 1
- The Deathly Hallows – Part 2
- Lego Harry Potter: Years 5–7
- Book of Spells
- Book of Potions
- Lego Dimensions
- Fantastic Beasts: Cases From the Wizarding World
- Hogwarts Mystery
- Wizards Unite
- Hogwarts Legacy

== Universe details ==
- Harry Potter universe
- List of Harry Potter characters

- Harry Potter
- Ron Weasley
- Hermione Granger
- Lord Voldemort
- Albus Dumbledore
- Severus Snape
- Ginny Weasley
- Draco Malfoy
- Neville Longbottom

- Luna Lovegood
- Minerva McGonagall
- Rubeus Hagrid
- Fred and George Weasley
- Sirius Black
- Remus Lupin
- Bellatrix Lestrange
- Cedric Diggory
- Dolores Umbridge

- Character groups
  - List of supporting Harry Potter characters
  - Order of the Phoenix (fictional organisation)
  - Death Eaters
  - Dumbledore's Army
  - Hogwarts staff
- Places in Harry Potter
  - Beauxbatons
  - Diagon Alley
  - Hogwarts
- Magic in Harry Potter
  - Magical creatures in Harry Potter
  - Magical objects in Harry Potter
  - Ministry of Magic
- Muggle
- Quidditch

== Attractions ==
- Harry Potter in amusement parks
  - The Wizarding World of Harry Potter
    - Orlando
    - Japan
    - Hollywood
    - Dragon Challenge
    - Flight of the Hippogriff
    - Hagrid's Magical Creatures Motorbike Adventure
    - Harry Potter and the Escape from Gringotts
    - Harry Potter and the Forbidden Journey
    - Hogwarts Express
- Harry Potter Movie Magic Experience
- Exhibitions
  - Harry Potter: The Exhibition
  - Harry Potter: A History of Magic
  - Warner Bros. Studio Tour London – The Making of Harry Potter
- Warner Bros. Studio Tour

== Fandom ==
- Harry Potter fandom
  - A Celebration of Harry Potter
  - Harry Potter Alliance
  - Mischief Management
- Websites
  - Harry Potter Fan Zone
  - The Harry Potter Lexicon
  - HPANA
  - The Leaky Cauldron (website)
    - PotterCast
  - MuggleNet
- Fan fiction
  - All the Young Dudes
  - Harry Potter and the Methods of Rationality
  - Hogwarts School of Prayer and Miracles
  - My Immortal
- Fan films
  - Hermione Granger and the Quarter Life Crisis
  - Severus Snape and the Marauders
  - Voldemort: Origins of the Heir
- Parodies
  - Potter Puppet Pals
  - Puffs, or Seven Increasingly Eventful Years at a Certain School of Magic and Magic
  - Skulduggery Pleasant: Phase Two
  - A Very Potter Musical
    - A Very Potter Musical (album)
  - A Very Potter Sequel
    - EP
  - A Very Potter Senior Year
  - Wizard People, Dear Reader
- Wizard rock
  - Wrockstock
  - Draco and the Malfoys
  - Harry and the Potters
    - Harry and the Potters (album)
    - Voldemort Can't Stop the Rock!
    - Harry and the Potters and the Power of Love
    - Lumos (album)
    - Harry and the Potters discography
  - Ministry of Magic (band)
  - Myles Kane

== Analysis ==
- Harry Potter influences and analogues
- Harry Potter in translation
- Legal disputes over the Harry Potter series
  - Harry Potter in Calcutta
  - Hari Puttar: A Comedy of Terrors
  - Tanya Grotter
  - Warner Bros. Entertainment Inc. v. RDR Books
- Politics of Harry Potter
- Religious debates over the Harry Potter series
- Harry, A History
- Harry Potter and the Sacred Text
- The Magical Worlds of Harry Potter
- Pollomuhku ja Posityyhtynen
- Potterless

== Other ==
- Portkey Games
- Lego Harry Potter
- Harry Potter Trading Card Game
- List of organisms named after the Harry Potter series

== See also ==
- Harry Potter (disambiguation)
