= HPANA =

Harry Potter electronic fan site

- Website type: Harry Potter fan site
- Owner: Jeff Guillaume
- Creator: Jeff Guillaume
- Website: hpana.com
- Launched: October 15, 2002; 24 years ago
- Current status: Online

The Harry Potter Automatic News Aggregator, or HPANA, as it is better known, is a Harry Potter fansite created in 2002 to monitor news on the Internet about J. K. Rowling's series of novels about the eponymous wizard.

== History ==
HPANA is operated by its founder, software developer Jeff Guillaume, and a volunteer staff who monitor and post news items, attend events in order to cover them for the site, and moderate the forums. Like other Harry Potter fan sites, HPANA's representatives have been invited to Leavesden Film Studios, the permanent set outside London on which the Warner Bros. movie adaptations are created, as well as the majority of the films' red carpet premieres around the world. The site was invited in 2007 to an exclusive web cast during which the studio, along with Universal Orlando Resort, revealed their intentions to build The Wizarding World of Harry Potter theme park, which opened in 2010.

The site began working with a travel company in 2003 to offer tours of the United Kingdom with a Harry Potter focus, dubbed HP Fan Trips. Over 100 people joined its initial trip in 2004 and hundreds more in the years since. A staple of these trips is a ride on steam locomotive #5972 Olton Hall, the train used in the Harry Potter films as the Hogwarts Express.

In July 2005, HPANA and MuggleNet along with publisher Wizarding World Press held Spellbound! 2005, an event to celebrate the release of Harry Potter and the Half-Blood Prince in Mt. Prospect, Illinois. More than 10,000 people attended the free event, played games and watched live stage performances while they waited for the midnight book debut.

Rowling in 2011 introduced a companion web site to her books, Pottermore, by working with HPANA and other fan sites to release clues for fans to discover the name of the new project. In November 2011, HPANA went offline due to lack of funding. Three years later, the site returned in limited form with access to its news archive.

=== Podcast ===
The site began featuring Hogwarts Radio as its official podcast in January 2009, featuring news, analysis and editorial content.

== Awards ==
J.K. Rowling, upon giving HPANA her "Fan Site Award" in December 2004, said it was the first Harry Potter fan site she ever visited. "A fantastically user-friendly fansite," Rowling remarked, "faster off the mark with Harry Potter news than any other site I know, and with all kinds of brilliantly inventive touches." HPANA was featured on USA Today's "Hot Sites" list on November 2, 2004.

== See also ==
- Harry Potter fandom
