= Scorbus =

Pairing in Harry Potter fandom

In the Harry Potter fandom, Scorbus, also known as Albus Potter/Scorpius Malfoy, is the pairing of the fictional characters Albus Severus Potter and Scorpius Malfoy, who have major roles in the 2016 play Harry Potter and the Cursed Child. It is a form of shipping. The two are depicted as friends in the original script, though later revisions have made their relationship more explicitly romantic, following accusations of queerbaiting.

== Background ==
The play revolves around the relationship between Albus and Scorpius, who are 11 when the play begins and 15 by the end. Albus is the son of Harry Potter while Scorpius is the son of Harry's frenemy Draco Malfoy. The two first meet on the train to Hogwarts, where Albus and Rose Granger-Weasley find Scorpius sitting alone in a compartment. Albus offers to sit with him while Rose avoids Scorpius due to him being the son of Draco. They are later both sorted into Slytherin. As the years pass, Albus struggles with being unpopular and Scorpius, who suffers from rumours implicating him as the son of Lord Voldemort, is the only person in whom he can confide. When Albus hugs Scorpius, the latter states: "Hello. Um. Have we hugged before? Do we hug?" After Albus returns from his first time-travelling trip with Scorpius injured, Harry tells him to stay away from the latter. Albus refuses to do so, calling Scorpius his "best" and "only" friend. Harry then uses the Marauder's Map to track Albus, forcing him to avoid Scorpius. They eventually meet in the library, where Albus calls Scorpius kind to the "depths of [his] belly, to the tips of [his] fingers" and the "best" person he knows. The two hug again and smile at each other afterward.

Aja Romano of Vox writes: "In the play, the two boys are utterly devoted to each other. They exchange long, sensual hugs. They’re jealous of competing relationships and unwilling to be separated from one another." In one scene, Scorpius witnesses Albus engaged in conversation with a girl and the script notes that "part of him likes it and part of him doesn't." In another, Scorpius' love for Albus is compared by a character to that of the canonically romantic adoration character Severus Snape had for Lily Potter. However, Scorpius instead expresses romantic interest in Rose, who mildly reciprocates his advances by the end of the play.

Later in the play, Scorpius uses the time turner, accidentally altering the timeline such that Lord Voldemort kills Harry, thus causing Albus to cease to exist. In this timeline, Scorpius is "living atop a social hierarchy with considerable power and influence." However, Scorpius chooses to instead return to the original timeline. The Snape of this timeline observes that he is "giving up" his "kingdom" for Albus while Delphi Diggory tells him: "Albus needs you, Scorpius. That’s a wonderful thing…. You two — you belong together." Following Albus's return, Scorpius states that he loves the former being "all dry humour and Albus-y". In the two characters' final scene together, Scorpius tells Albus that he will ask Rose out, and that regardless of her response, it will be the "acorn that will grow into our eventual marriage". They hug again and Albus says, "What's this? I thought we decided we don’t hug?" Scorpius then says that he "wasn’t sure. Whether we should. In this new version of us I had in my head."

There are some pieces of fan fiction for the ship that predate the play by several years.

Jessica Seymour writes that the play "privileges adolescent friendship as the source and catalyst for power through a complex portrayal of the effects of friendship on a narrtive arc from beginning to end." She argues that the friendship between the two characters "pushes the narrative toward a more collaborative and supportive relationship between the demographics."

In a revision to the play's script, an expanded scene at the end depicted a conversation between Harry and Albus, in which the latter tells the former that Scorpius is the "most important" person in his life and that he might remain the most important. Harry responds by smiling and acknowledging this and expressing his support. The scene in which Albus and Scorpius talked about girlfriends was also removed.

== Analysis and reception ==
On an argument between Albus and his father due to his inability to meet the latter's expectations, Brian Murray of the University of Pittsburgh writes that his "language is particularly reminiscent of gay, coming-out narratives, whose vernacular similarly stress an inability to change in response to parental rejection." Murray writes: "He has different experiences than those around him, particularly his family. This difference leads to Albus’ isolation from and conflict with his father, who futilely wishes his son to be different. This conflict operates the same way a queer child exists in a suffocating, heteronormative environment." He argues that the relationship between Albus and Scorpius is "deeply woven" and "builds upon and seems to correct some of the earlier, prejudicial elements", the latter point in reference to Draco having previously been depicted as a "racist, elitist bully". Gavia Baker-Whitelaw of The Daily Dot described the ship as a "next-generation twist" on Drarry, the ship between Harry and Draco. Marthe-Siobhán Hecke argues that Albus's struggles with society's and his father's expectations of him "might be interpreted as the struggle of persons trying to come to terms with their identity and specifically their sexuality.

Murray argues that the play's "stress on the power of empathy and compassion causes Scorpius to choose his love for Albus over great personal gain." He writes that their friendship is "distinct in its depth and its non-normativity" and that it "breaks down previous forms of masculinized friendships, clearing way for new, queer possibilities." With regard to Scorpius's response to Albus's hug, Murray argues that it "holds little purpose past evoking awkwardness and discomfort". He writes that it "appears out of character, given their previously free verbal affection" and that the "clear discomfort reinforces traditional masculinity, dispelling any possibility that these characters are homosexual". On the relationship between Scorpius and Rose, Murray writes that it is an "incredibly rushed, unmotivated romantic pairing" and that the "sudden expectation of the audience/reader to accept this new romantic possibility is baffling." He concludes that the "story of Scorpius and Albus [ends] in a moment of protective masculinity, a moment which otherwise could have been new ground for Harry Potter." However, Hecke instead suggests that their initial hug could be read as Albus expressing his "need for being comforted by the only person who understands him", or that it "might also be more than a gesture of understanding between friends, especially as the experience is awkward for both of them."

Baker-Whitelaw writes that the characters' relationship is "affectionate and emotionally intense" and "can easily be interpreted as a youthful precursor to romance." She also compared Scorpius's expression of jealousy when Albus is with Delphi, comparing it with the bickering of characters Ron Weasley and Hermione Granger, who eventually enter a romantic relationship. Baker-Whitelaw argues that the relationship "unintentionally highlights the lack of queer characters in the series" and that it "feels like a missed opportunity—not least because same-sex relationships are often framed as "adult-rated."" She concludes that it "would have been revolutionary to see Scorpius have a crush on Albus in a similar way to his crush on Rose, but apparently when it comes to The Cursed Child‘s fanfic callbacks, queer representation was a step too far." Hecke argues that while Scorpius's jealousy towards Delphi for talking with Albus could mean that he "does not like it because he wants to stay his only friend", it could also imply that Scorpius "partially likes to see Albus interested in a girl and simultaneously dislikes Albus behaving in accordance with the heteronormative matrix."

Hecke calls Scorpius's open expression of his adoration of Albus's personality a "statement one perhaps would not expect from a fifteen-year-old teenager." She argues that while the final scene "ultimately undermines the tentatively established queerness and resumes a heteronormative stance", the pair's last hug could mean that they have either "decided that physical contact between two men is nothing to be ashamed of (in defiance of homosexual panic)" or that they have "come to terms with their romantic feelings for each other", and that the scene "could be understood as them having accepted either a friendship that allows a certain amount of intimacy, or even a non-platonic sexual interest." Hecke notes that their relationship is more complex and ambiguous than that of Ron and Harry, who "appeared to be at ease in their behaviour towards each other and in their interest in girls."

According to Marion Gymnich, Denise Burkhard and Hanne Birk, both characters had already become popular in fan fiction by 2017, which they wrote was "presumably to a certain extent due to the fact that the presentation of these adolescent boys renders a queer reading possible, which ties in with the overall popularity of ‘slash’ fan fiction".

=== Accusations of queerbaiting ===
Many LGBTQ+ fans of the franchise accused the play of queerbaiting; this came after the announcement that Albus Dumbledore's sexuality would not be explicitly depicted in Fantastic Beasts: The Crimes of Grindelwald. Discontented with the canonical status of the relationship between Albus and Scorpius, some fans began rewriting certain parts of the play such that the two characters end up in a romantic relationship. The director behind the initial staging of the play, John Tiffany, who is himself gay, stated that while the play is "a love story between Scorpius and Albus in lots of ways" but that it "would not be appropriate" to depict the two in an explicitly romantic relationship and that the play does not tell how Scorpius is "going to carry on with the rest of his life".

Romano wrote that criticism was directed at the "way the script spends its time building evidence for a canonically queer relationship between the two boys, only to brutally yank it away at the end with a flimsy "No Homo" excuse." Jessie Earl of The Advocate wrote that many fans saw a "clear gay subtext" between Albus and Scorpius and that "despite an entire scene devoted to them simply giving longing looks to each other and others of them explicitly reaffirming their love for each other, the play ends with them randomly pursuing straight relationships." She opined that it "comes across as simple queerbaiting."

In defence of what he considered "queer subtext" in the relationship between Albus and Scorpius, Manuel Betancourt of Pacific Standard wrote that in allowing audiences to "revel in ambiguity and in subtextual cues, Harry Potter and The Cursed Child assumes that it has a knowing audience — one that understands that gayness need not only be about legible identities, but about readable behavior; not only about flag waving, but about furtive glances", and that the "investment and celebration of subtext need not be antithetical to a progressive agenda of LGBT representation."

Ilana Masad of The Guardian argued that the play "should be celebrated for what it does do on the page: portray a loving relationship between two boys, who may or may not be in love." She writes: "The lack of representation of even casual intimacy between men may be one of the reasons fans so desperately wish these male characters into romantic relationships – leading to accusations of queerbaiting when they don't see their fantasy officially told. This isn't to say that queerbaiting isn't real – but there’s a reason why we see closeness between men as almost intrinsically gay. And that is a problem in itself." Masad concludes that the depiction of a close and intimate is "still progress" even if it might not be "as progressive as some may want". In response to Masad, Romano argues that the Harry Potter universe is "already rife with intimate straight male friendships" that do not have homoerotic subtext, unlike the relationship between Albus and Scorpus. Comparing it to that of other characters in the series, she writes that the relationship is the "textbook example of the kind of romance that gets cultivated at Hogwarts and then evolves into marriage after school."

With regard to the controversy, Romano opined that the "abundant straightness of the wizarding world is the most damning evidence of the Harry Potter universe's failure to evolve." She noted that the "anger" in the Harry Potter fandom over the portrayal of the relationship between Albus and Scorpius was then "especially potent" as fans had "already spent years being angry at Rowling for her treatment of other queer characters in her books." She further wrote that the controversy was representative "larger cultural shift in fandom toward nuanced representation and a desire for diverse characters and worldbuilding." On the relationship between the characters itself, she wrote that "sexual subtext hovers at the edges of Albus and Scorpius' interactions, as they make awkward overtures into exploring their sexuality with girls." She added that the characters' interest in girls "seems to be added as an afterthought, wedged in throughout the play in underdeveloped, unconvincing moments", with Scorpius' advances towards Rose being a troubling version of the "wear the girl down" trope.

Ben Neutze of Time Out wrote that the play "denies the sweet queer love story built into it" and that "every time a crush on a girl is alluded to, it feels like JK Rowling is shouting “no homo!” at the audience." In response to Tiffany's claim that portraying the two characters in a relationship would be inappropriate, Neutze notes that Harry Potter and the Goblet of Fire, which takes place when Harry is 15, depicts several romances. He also argued that if it is appropriate for Albus and Scorpius to discuss crushes with one another, it is "no less appropriate to acknowledge any of those feelings they might have for one another."

Ashley Lee of The Los Angeles Times described the revised scene as a "more explicit acknowledgment of Albus and Scorpius' gay romance". In a review of the shortened production, Joey Sims of Theatrely writes that the play "now eagerly places Albus and Scorpius’ love story at its center, without shyness or shame" and that it "seems right that Albus and Scorpius would, by this story’s end, have reached an understanding of how important they are to one another without yet fully comprehending what that means." Tom Beasley of The Digital Fix, who argued that the "closeness of their bond and their loyalty to each other above all else is the core of the play, even more than Harry’s struggles with being a good father when he never got to know his own dad", called the newly expanded scene a "beautiful, subtle moment in which father and son acknowledge the depth of the connection between Albus and Scorpius."
