= Harry Potter fandom =

Community of fans of the Harry Potter books and films

The Harry Potter fandom is the community of fans of the Harry Potter books and films who participate in entertainment activities that revolve around the series, such as reading and writing fan fiction, creating and soliciting fan art, engaging in role-playing games, socialising on Harry Potter-based forums, and more. The fandom interacts online as well as offline through activities such as fan conventions, participating in cosplay, tours of iconic landmarks relevant to the books and production of the films, and parties held for the midnight release of each book and film.

By the fourth Harry Potter book, the legions of fans had grown so large that considerable security measures were taken to ensure that no copy of the book was leaked before the official release date. Harry Potter is considered one of the few four-quadrant, multi-generation spanning franchises that exist today, despite Rowling's original marketing of the books to tweens and teens.

== Pottermania ==
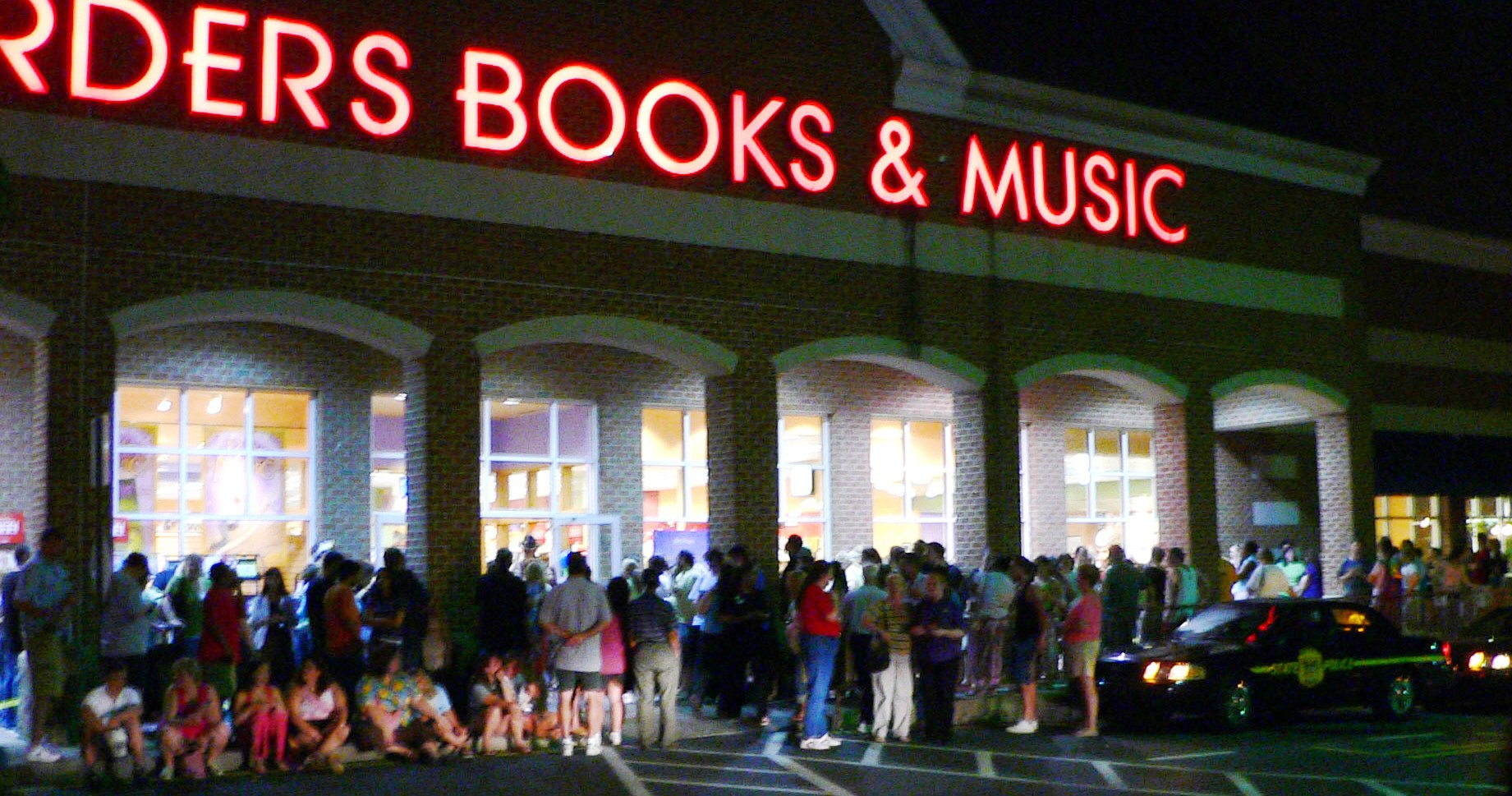
Potter fans wait in lines outside a Borders bookstore for their copy of Harry Potter and the Half-Blood Prince.

Pottermania is an informal term first used around 1999 describing the craze Harry Potter fans have had over the series. Fans held midnight parties to celebrate the release of the final four books at bookstores which stayed open on the night leading into the date of the release. In 2005, Entertainment Weekly listed the midnight release of Harry Potter and the Goblet of Fire as one of "Entertainment's Top Moments" of the previous 25 years.

Diehard fans of the series are called "Potterheads". Some even theme their weddings around Harry Potter. A Bridal Guide featured two real weddings soon before the release of the final film, which quickly spread through the fandom via Facebook, Twitter, and Tumblr.

The craze over the series was referenced in Lauren Weisberger's 2003 novel The Devil Wears Prada as well as its 2006 film adaptation. In the story, the protagonist Andrea Sachs is ordered to retrieve two copies of the next instalment in the series for her boss's twins before they are published so that they can be privately flown to France, where the twins and their mother are on holiday.

Some celebrity fans of Harry Potter include Lily Allen, Guillermo del Toro, Ariana Grande, Stephen King, Keira Knightley, Jennifer Lawrence, Evanna Lynch, Barack Obama, Simon Pegg, ASAP Rocky, Seth Rogen, Matt Smith, Jeremy Davis, Kellan Lutz, and Margot Robbie. Robert Pattinson said of the series, "Harry Potter was what made me become an actor. I credit Harry Potter with everything else that's come since for me. I didn't know what I was doing before that."

== Fan sites ==
There are many fan web sites about Harry Potter on the Internet, the oldest ones dating to about 1997 or 1998. One of the most famous sites allows fans of the book an opportunity to be sorted into a house themselves. J. K. Rowling has an open relationship with her fan base, and since 2004 periodically hands out a "fan site award" on her official web site. The first site to receive the award was Immeritus, a fan site mostly devoted to Sirius Black, and about which Rowling wrote, "I am so proud of the fact that a character, whom I always liked very much, though he never appeared as much more than a brooding presence in the books, has gained a passionate fan-club."

In 2004, after Immeritus, Rowling bestowed the honour upon four sites. The first was Godric's Hollow; for some time however, the site's domain name was occupied by advertisers and its content was lost and there is no further record on Rowling's site that Godric's Hollow ever received the award, although in 2010 the website came back online again albeit with a lot of content missing. The next site was the Harry Potter Lexicon, an online encyclopedia Rowling has admitted to visiting while writing away from home rather than buying a copy of her books in a store. She called it "for the dangerously obsessive; my natural home." The third site of 2004 was MuggleNet, a web site featuring the latest news in the Potter world, among editorials, forums, and a podcast. Rowling wrote when giving the award, "It's high time I paid homage to the mighty MuggleNet," and listed all the features she loved, including "the pretty-much-exhaustive information on all books and films." The last site was HPANA, the first fan site Rowling ever visited, "faster off the mark with Harry Potter news than any other site" Rowling knows, and "fantastically user-friendly."

In 2005, only The Leaky Cauldron was honoured. In Rowling's words, "it is about the worst kept secret on this website that I am a huge fan of The Leaky Cauldron," which she calls a "wonderfully well designed mine of accurate information on all things Harry Potter." On another occasion, Rowling has called the Leaky Cauldron her "favourite fan site." In 2006, the Brazilian website Potterish was the only site honoured, in recognition of its "style, [its] Potter-expertise and [its] responsible reporting."

In May 2007, Harry Potter Fan Zone received the award. Rowling recognised the insightful editorials as well as praised the site for its young and dedicated staff. In December 2007, the award went to The Harry Potter Alliance, a campaign that seeks to end discrimination, genocide, poverty, AIDS, global warming, and other "real-world Dark Arts", relating these problems to the books. Rowling called the project "extraordinary" and "most inspirational", and paralleled its mission to "the values for which Dumbledore's Army fought in the books". In an article about her in Time magazine, Rowling expressed her gratefulness at the site's successful work raising awareness and sign-up levels among anti-genocide coalitions.

At one time, Warner Bros., which owns the rights to Harry Potter and its affiliates, tried to shut down the sites. The unsuccessful attempt eventually led to their inviting the webmasters of the top sites to premieres of the films and tours of the film sets, because of their close connection with the fans. Warner Bros. executives have acknowledged that many fans are disappointed that certain elements of the books are left out, but not trying to avoid criticism, "bringing the fan sites into the process is what we feel is really important."

These fan sites contain news updates into the world of the books, films, and film cast members through the use of forums, image galleries, or video galleries. They also host user-submitted creations, such as fan art or fan fiction.

=== Podcasts ===
The Harry Potter fandom has embraced podcasts as a regular, often weekly, insight to the latest discussion in the fandom. Apple Inc. has featured two of the podcasts, MuggleCast and PotterCast. Both have reached the top spot of iTunes podcast rankings and have been polled one of the top 50 favorite podcasts. At the 2006 Podcast Awards, when MuggleCast and PotterCast each received two nominations for the same two categories, the two podcasts teamed up and requested listeners vote for PotterCast in the Best Entertainment category and MuggleCast in the People's Choice category. Both podcasts won these respective categories.

MuggleCast, hosted by MuggleNet staffers, was created in August 2005, not long after the release of Half-Blood Prince. Topics of the first show focused on Horcruxes, "R.A.B.", the Goblet of Fire film, which was due for release two months later, and the website DumbledoreIsNotDead.com. Since then, MuggleCast has held chapter-by-chapter discussions, character analyses, and a discussion on a "theory of the week". MuggleCast has also added humour to their podcast with segments like "Spy on Spartz," where the hosts would call MuggleNet webmaster Emerson Spartz and reveal his current location or activity with the listening audience. British staff member Jamie Lawrence tells a British joke of the week, and host Andrew Sims reads an email sent to MuggleNet with a strange request or incoherent talk (dubbed "Huh?! Email of the Week"). MuggleCast is currently the highest-rated Harry Potter podcast on the Internet.

PotterCast was released less than two weeks after MuggleCast's first episode. Produced by The Leaky Cauldron, it differed from MuggleCast with a more structured program, including various segments and involvement of more people on the Leaky Cauldron staff compared to MuggleCast. It also was the first Potter podcast to produce regular interviews with people directly involved with the books and films. The first show featured interviews with Stuart Craig, art director of the films, as well as Bonnie Wright, who plays Ginny Weasley. PotterCast has also interviewed Matthew Lewis (the actor who portrays Neville Longbottom), Evanna Lynch (Luna Lovegood), Jamie Waylett (Vincent Crabbe), Rupert Grint (Ron Weasley), Chris Columbus, Alfonso Cuarón, Mike Newell (directors of the first four films), Arthur A. Levine and Cheryl Klein (editors of the books at Scholastic), and Rowling herself.

The two sites are friendly rivals and have aired several combined episodes, which they call "The Leaky Mug", a separate podcast released on a separate feed from time to time. Live joint podcasts have been held in New York City, Las Vegas, and California. From time to time, hosts on one podcast will appear on their counterpart.

Other notable Harry Potter podcasts include:

- Harry Potter and the Sacred Text, in which the books are read as if they were a religious text;
- Witch Please, which looks at the books through a feminist lens;
- Potterotica, in which actors read Harry Potter fan fiction aloud;
- Potterless, a comedy podcast in which an adult man reads the books for the first time and tries to predict future plot points;

=== TikTok ===
TikTok has also played a major role in reviving and reshaping the online Harry Potter fandom in the late 2010s and early 2020s, particularly among Generation Z fans. Communities such as "DracoTok" became especially popular on the platform, creating new interpretations of characters through fancasts, fanfiction edits, memes, and roleplay-style videos.

“DracoTok” refers to a TikTok subcommunity centered around Draco Malfoy, often romanticizing or reinterpreting the character through edits, cosplay, and fanfiction culture. The trend became widely recognized during the COVID-19 pandemic, with many users engaging in "shifting" culture, character reenactments, and ship-based content. Media outlets including the New York Times and Vanity Fair also discussed the phenomenon as part of TikTok's broader resurgence of Harry Potter fan culture.

== Fan writings ==
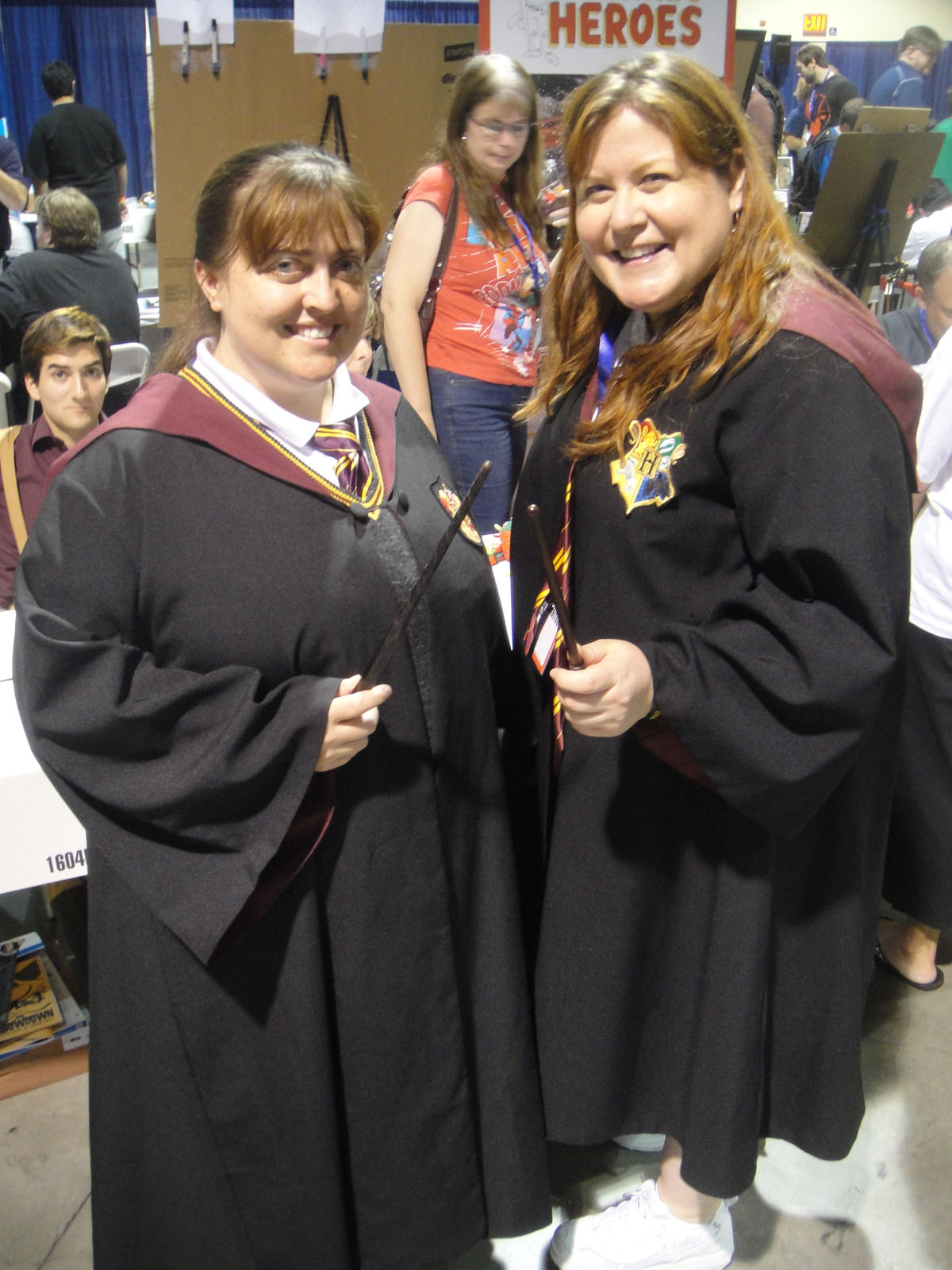
Fans dressed as Hogwarts students at Long Beach Comic & Horror Con 2011

=== Fan fiction ===
Rowling has backed fan fiction stories on the Internet, stories written by fans that involve Harry Potter or other characters in the books. A March 2007 study showed that "Harry Potter" is the most searched-for fan fiction subject online. Some fans will use canon established in the books to write stories of past and future events in the Harry Potter world; others write stories that have little relation to the books other than the characters' names and the settings in which the fan fiction takes place. On FanFiction.Net, there are over 834,000, while Archive of Our Own has over 546,000 fan fictions on Harry Potter as of December 2024. There are numerous websites devoted solely to Harry Potter fan fiction. Of these, according to rankings on Alexa.com, HarryPotterFanfiction.com has grown to be the most popular.

A well-known work of fan fiction is The Shoebox Project, created by two LiveJournal users. Over 8500 people subscribed to the story so that they would be alerted when new posts update the story. The authors' works, including this project, were featured in an article in The Wall Street Journal discussing the growth in popularity of fandoms.

The current most reviewed piece of fan fiction, with over 40,000 reviews, is All The Young Dudes by Archive of our Own user MsKingBean89. The work is the most-viewed piece of fan fiction on Archive of Our Own, with over 16,000,000 hits.

In 2006, the "popular 'bad' fanfic" My Immortal was posted on FanFiction.Net by user "Tara Gilesbie". It was deleted by the site's administrators in 2008, but not before amassing over eight thousand negative reviews. It spawned a number of YouTube spoofs and a number of imitators created "sequels" claiming to be the original Tara.

In 2007, a web-based novel, James Potter and the Hall of Elders' Crossing, was written by a computer animator named George Lippert. The book was written as a supplement to fill the void after Deathly Hallows, and received eventual approval from Rowling herself.

In 2025 the novel Alchemised by SenLinYu based on their fan fiction story imagining a relationship between Hermione Granger and Draco Malfoy was set to be published by Penguin Books with the film rights purchased by Legendary Entertainment.

Rowling has said, "I find it very flattering that people love the characters that much." She has adopted a positive position on fan fiction, unlike authors such as Anne McCaffrey or Anne Rice who discourage fans from writing about their books and have asked sites like FanFiction.Net to remove all stories of their works, requests honored by the site. However, Rowling has been "alarmed by pornographic or sexually explicit material clearly not meant for kids," according to Neil Blair, an attorney for her publisher. The attorneys have sent cease and desist letters to sites that host adult material.

Potter fan fiction has a large following in the slash fiction genre, stories which feature romantic or sexual relationships (shipping), usually portraying homosexual pairings. Famous pairings include Harry with Draco Malfoy ("Drarry") or Cedric Diggory, and Remus Lupin with Sirius Black ("Wolfstar"). In 2013 Drarry was the most highly-represented topic in Harry Potter slash fiction on AO3, while by 2023 the pairing was surpassed by Wolfstar. Harry Potter slash has eroded some of the antipathy towards underage sexuality in the wider slash fandom.

Tracey "T" Proctor, a moderator of FictionAlley.org, a Harry Potter fan fiction website, said 'I don't really get into the children's aspect of it, but rather the teachers, the adult characters. I read someone once who said, "If she didn't want us fantasizing about her characters, she needs to stop having these handsome men portraying them." And that's the truth: It's very hard not to look at Alan Rickman [Professor Severus Snape] and Jason Isaacs [Lucius Malfoy] and not get erotic thoughts. I have some fan fiction at Fiction Alley. You want to write stories about the characters that J.K. is not writing, about their love lives that you don't see in the book.'

In November 2006, Jason Isaacs, who played Lucius Malfoy in the Potter films, said that he had read fan fiction about his character and gets "a huge kick out of the more far-out stuff."

=== Non fiction ===
With the rise in popularity of the Harry Potter series and its associated fandom, a range of non-fiction works emerged, including cookbooks such as The Official Harry Potter Cookbook, filmmaking guides such as Harry Potter Page to Screen, and analytical works such as The Magical Worlds of Harry Potter, which explores the series’ mythological and literary influences. Media coverage at the time noted that some of these publications were produced to capitalize on the franchise’s success, including J. K. Rowling: The Wizard Behind Harry Potter, which was a New York Times bestseller but described in reviews as derivative and lacking original research.

=== Discussion ===
Prior to the publication of Deathly Hallows, much of the energy of the Potter fandom was devoted to speculation and debate about upcoming plot and character developments. To this end, clues from the earlier books and deliberate hints from J. K. Rowling (in interviews and on her website) were heavily scrutinised by fans. In particular, fan essays were published on websites such as Mugglenet (the "world famous editorials"), the Harry Potter Lexicon and The Leaky Cauldron (Scribbulus project) among others: offering theories, comment and analysis on all aspects of the series. The Yahoo discussion list Harry Potter for Grown Ups (founded in 1999) is also noteworthy for its detailed criticism and discussion of the Harry Potter books.

Speculation intensified with the July 2005 publication of Half-Blood Prince and the detailed post-publication interview given by Rowling to Mugglenet and The Leaky Cauldron. Notably, DumbledoreIsNotDead.com sought to understand the events of the sixth book in a different way. (Rowling later confirmed, however – on 2 August 2006 – that Dumbledore was, in fact, dead, humorously apologising to the website as she did so.) A collection of essays, Who Killed Albus Dumbledore?: What Really Happened in Harry Potter and the Half-Blood Prince? Six Expert Harry Potter Detectives Examine the Evidence, was published by Zossima Press in November 2006. Contributors included the Christian author John Granger and Joyce Odell of Red Hen Publications, whose own website contains numerous essays on the Potterverse and fandom itself.

In 2006, in advance of the arrival of the seventh Potter novel, five MuggleNet staff members co-authored the reference book Mugglenet.Com's What Will Happen in Harry Potter 7: Who Lives, Who Dies, Who Falls in Love and How Will the Adventure Finally End, an anthology of unofficial fan predictions; while early in 2007, Leaky launched HarryPotterSeven.com, featuring "roundups and predictions from some of the most knowledgeable fans online" (including Steve Vander Ark of the Lexicon). Late additions to the fan scene (prior to the publication of Deathly Hallows) included BeyondHogwarts.com (the successor to DumbledoreIsNotDead.com), which billed itself as "the only ongoing online Harry Potter fan conference", as well as Book7.co.uk, which offered a hypothetical "evidence-based synopsis" of the seventh novel. To this day, debate and reaction to the novels and films continues on web forums (including Mugglenet's Chamber of Secrets community and TLC's Leaky Lounge).

== Fan film and television ==
A 2018 Italian fan-made prequel to the series, Voldemort: Origins of the Heir, depicts the story of Tom Riddle's rise to power. The teaser trailer was released on in June 2017, receiving more than thirty million views in less than 48 hours on Facebook. The full movie was later released on YouTube on 13 January 2018, receiving over twelve million views in ten days.

Hermione Granger and the Quarter Life Crisis is an online TV series focused on Hermione Granger's life after Hogwarts. In the show, Granger, cast as a black woman played by Ashley Romans, has broken up with Ron Weasley and moved to Los Angeles to reevaluate her life and choices.

A 2020 Vulture Works' fan-made film, James Potter and the Heir of the Sword, starts with the epilogue of Deathly Hallows. Jealous of the relationship between Scorpius Malfoy and Albus Severus Potter, Albus' brother James is in conflict with Scorpius to be the best brother, while the prophecy of King Arthur's Monster, which occurs every 100 years, hits Hogwarts.

== Conventions ==
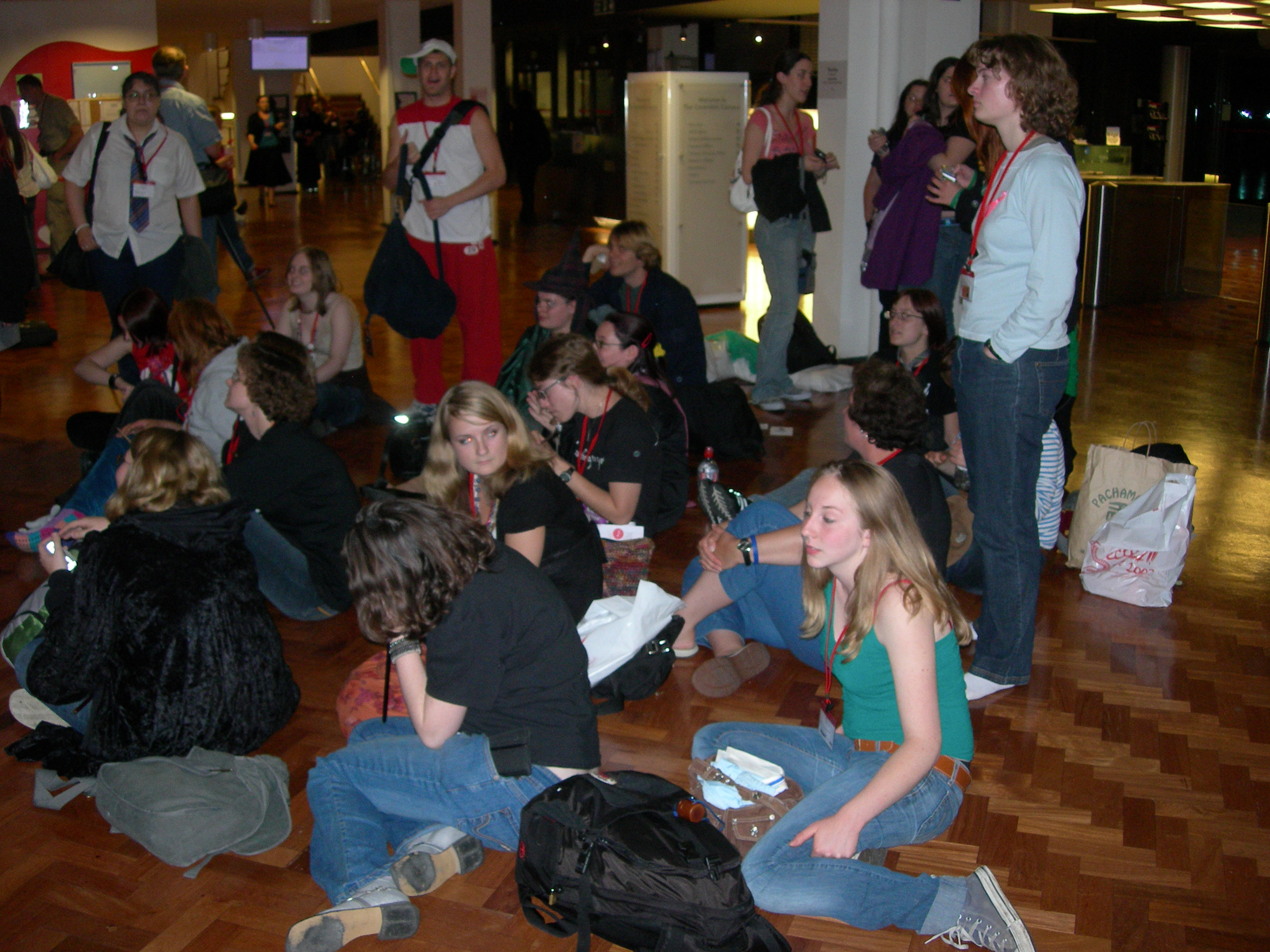
Attendees of Sectus convention in London await the midnight release of Harry Potter and the Deathly Hallows

Fan conventions have been another way that the fandom has congregated. Conventions such as Prophecy, LeakyCon, Infinitus, Azkatraz, and Ascendio have maintained an academic emphasis, hosting professional keynote speakers as well as keeping the atmosphere playful and friendly. They have featured prominent members of the fandom such as Jennie Levine, owner of SugarQuill.net (Phoenix Rising, 2007); Melissa Anelli, current webmaster of The Leaky Cauldron (Phoenix Rising, 2007; Leakycon, 2009/2011/2012); Sue Upton, former Senior Editor of the Leaky Cauldron (Prophecy, 2007); Heidi Tandy, founder of Fiction Alley (Prophecy, 2007), Paul and Joe DeGeorge of the wizard rock band Harry and the Potters (along with several other more well-known Wizard Rock bands such as The Remus Lupins, The Parselmouths, Ministry of Magic, and The Whomping Willows) (see below) (Prophecy, 2007; Leakycon, 2009/2011/2012), Andrew Slack, founder of The Harry Potter Alliance, and StarKid, the cast of the fan made musicals "A Very Potter Musical", "A Very Potter Sequel", and "A Very Potter Senior Year".

Still, the conventions try to attract the fandom with other fun-filled Potter-centric activities, often more interactive, such as wizarding chess, water Quidditch, a showing of the Harry Potter films, or local cultural immersions. Live podcasts are often recorded during these events, and live Wizard Rock shows have become a fairly large part of recent conventions. Members of the Harry Potter cast have been brought in for the conferences; actors such as Evanna Lynch (Luna Lovegood) and Christopher Rankin (Percy Weasley), along with several others, have appeared to give live Q&A sessions and keynote presentations about the series.

In addition to fandom-specific programming, LeakyCon 2011 and 2012 have hosted LitDays (as well as incorporating the many fandoms Harry Potter fans have branched into since the ending of the series). LitDays are full of programming with authors, agents, and editors. A few key examples are John Green, author of the young adult novels The Fault in Our Stars and Looking for Alaska; Scott Westerfeld, author of the Uglies series and Leviathan; and David Levithan, author of Nick & Norah's Infinite Playlist and The Lover's Dictionary.

These conventions sometimes incorporate the themed area The Wizarding World of Harry Potter into their itinerary, located at Universal Islands of Adventure in Orlando, Florida and at other Universal Studios theme parks around the world. At the Harry Potter fan conventions Infinitus 2010, LeakyCon 2011, and Ascendio 2012, special events were held in the Wizarding World area at Islands of Adventure, including after-hours events for convention attendees who purchased tickets to experience and explore the park by themselves. The events also included talks given by creators of the themed area, free food and butterbeer, and live wizard rock shows.

== Festivals ==
In addition to conventions, Harry Potter fandom has further expanded to town festivals, including the Chestertown Harry Potter Festival (Maryland), the Chestnut Hill Harry Potter Festival (Philadelphia), Edgerton's Harry Potter Festival (Wisconsin), and the Spellbound Festival (Michigan, 2016; Ontario, 2018; New York, 2019), among others. The Chestnut Hill event had been held annually for seven years until 2018 when it was rebranded under a more general "Witches and Wizards" theme, following a cease and desist letter from Warner Bros.

== "Ship debates" ==
In the fandom, the word "ship" and its derivatives like "shipping" or "shipper" are commonly used as shorthand for the word "relationship". The Harry Potter series generated ship debates with supporters of the prospective relationship between Harry Potter and his close female friend Hermione Granger at odds with supporters of Hermione ending up instead with Ron Weasley, close friend of both, as well as supporters of Harry ending up with Ginny Weasley, Ron's younger sister.

An interview with Rowling conducted by fansite webmasters Emerson Spartz (MuggleNet) and Melissa Anelli (The Leaky Cauldron) shortly after the book's release proved to be controversial. During the interview, Spartz commented that Harry/Hermione shippers were "delusional", to which Rowling chuckled, though making it clear that she did not share the sentiment and that the Harry/Hermione fans were "still valued members of her readership". This incident resulted in an uproar among Harry/Hermione shippers. The uproar was loud enough to merit an article in the San Francisco Chronicle.

Rowling's attitude towards the shipping phenomenon has varied between amused and bewildered to frustrated, as she revealed in that interview. She explained:

Well, you see, I'm a relative newcomer to the world of shipping, because for a long time, I didn't go on the net and look up Harry Potter. A long time. Occasionally I had to, because there were weird news stories or something that I would have to go and check, because I was supposed to have said something I hadn't said. I had never gone and looked at fan sites, and then one day I did and oh - my - god. Five hours later or something, I get up from the computer shaking slightly [all laugh]. 'What is going on?' And it was during that first mammoth session that I met the shippers, and it was a most extraordinary thing. I had no idea there was this huge underworld seething beneath me.

In a later posting on MuggleNet, Spartz explained:

My comments weren't directed at the shippers who acknowledged that Harry/Hermione was a long shot but loved the idea of them together. It was directed at the "militant" shippers who insisted that there was overwhelming canon proof and that everyone else was too blind to see it. You were delusional; you saw what you wanted to see and you have no one to blame for that but yourselves.

Rowling has continued to make references, less humorous and more, to the severity of the shipper conflicts. In one instance she has joked about trying to think of ways of proving to Emerson, when inviting him for the aforementioned interview, that it was really her and not "some angry Harry/Hermione shipper trying to lure him down a dark alleyway";

Rowling stated in a 2014 interview with Wonderland magazine that she thought that realistically Ron and Hermione had "too much fundamental incompatibility." She stated that Ron and Hermione were written together "as a form of wish fulfillment" as way to reconcile a relationship she herself was once in. She went on to say that perhaps with marriage counselling Ron and Hermione would have been all right. She also went on to say in a talk at Exeter University that Harry's love for Ginny is true, thereby denying any potential canon relationship between Harry and Hermione.

=== Other relationships ===
On a less intense scale, other relationships have been doted upon in the fandom from suggestive hints or explicit statements throughout canon, such as those between Draco Malfoy and Pansy Parkinson, Harry's parents James Potter and Lily Evans, Rubeus Hagrid and Olympe Maxime, or Percy Weasley and Penelope Clearwater, or Rose Granger-Weasley and Scorpius Malfoy. A potential relationship between Neville Longbottom and Luna Lovegood was originally dispelled by Rowling, though she later retracted this and said she noticed a slight attraction between them in Deathly Hallows.

Some couples, besides Harry and Ginny and Ron and Hermione, have been explicitly stated in the series: Bill Weasley and Fleur Delacour are married in Deathly Hallows after dating throughout Half-Blood Prince. In Half-Blood Prince, Nymphadora Tonks keeps her feelings for Remus Lupin to herself, but remains depressed when he refuses her advances; he feels that his being a werewolf would not create a safe relationship. Tonks professes her love for him at the end of the book, and she and Lupin have been married by the beginning of Deathly Hallows and have a son 'Teddy' later in the book. Other couples, such as Harry and Draco or Lupin and Sirius Black, are favourites among fans who read fan fiction about them. There is also debate about Lily and Severus vs. James.

== Roleplaying games ==
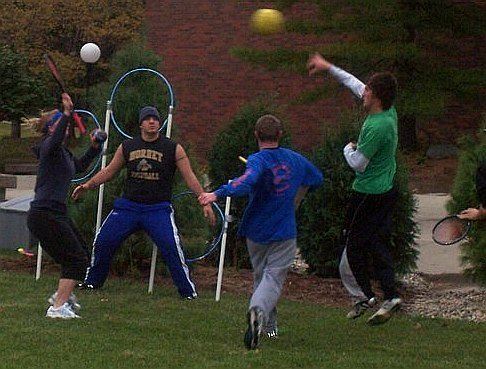
Millikin University students at their biannual Muggle Quidditch tournament, a form of live action roleplay.

Roleplaying is a central feature of the Harry Potter fandom. There are two primary forms: internet-based roleplay and live-action roleplay, or LARP.

LARPing often involves re-enacting or creating an original Quidditch team. Match rules and style of play vary among fandom events, but they are generally kept as close as possible to the sport envisioned by Rowling. The 2006 Lumos symposium included a Quidditch tournament played in water. More common are ground-based games such as the handball style developed by USA Team Handball and featured at the MuggleNet-sponsored Spellbound event, as well as the Muggle Quidditch style played intramurally at Millikin University (at left). This version of quidditch has grown past intramural play, is far from LARPing, and has an international governing body, the IQA.

Internet-based roleplay tries to simulate the Hogwarts experience. Many sites are forum-based, emphasizing taking classes taught by staff members in order for the players to earn points for their respective houses. Some internet-based roleplay sites go more in depth into canon and storylines, and do not specifically rely on posting as the only method for gaining house points while others have expanded to include activities such as Quidditch, dueling, and board-wide plots. Hogwarts-school.net (est. 2000), for example, is a forum-based roleplaying game which allows players to take classes, engage in extracurriculars, and also has many options for adult characters in St. Mungos, the Daily Prophet, and the Ministry of Magic.

2007 saw the launch of World of Hogwarts, a completely free MMORPG Harry Potter roleplaying game in Second Life, set ten years after the Battle of Hogwarts. Here, roleplayers can create an avatar and interact with other students, attend lessons organized by other roleplayers, play Quidditch, sit for their exams, earn and lose points for their house, visit Hogsmeade, Diagon Alley and the Forbidden Forest, get a job at the Ministry of Magic, explore several secret passages within the castle, and even immerse themselves into intricate and well-composed storyline plots that have, through time, grown into the canon rules of the game.

A website created by ISO Interactive, called the Chamber of Chat is a free online interactive virtual world under a MMO format. Although not a full MMORPG format, Chamber of Chat is set up with 3D virtual chatrooms and avatars where fans can socially interact with each other in Pictionary and Harry Potter Trivial games or participate in discussion groups about Harry Potter or Film media or perform plays as a theater group to other fans as audience. They hold special community event such as Harry Potters Birthday or Halloween and have seasonal house competitions. Fans are able to create their own avatars, collect or be rewarded coins to purchase furniture items for their own "clubhouse". However, the website emphasizes more social interaction between fans' avatars to stimulate the Hogwarts student experience. "Chamber of Chat is a graphical Social Virtual World with a few Facebook plug-ins. The Harry Potter Virtual World is designed for fans. This give users the feeling that they are interacting in the actual 3D world. You can hang out with other students, relax in the common room, mingle at the pub, play games like Pictionary and even download cool looking wallpapers."

On 19 April 2007, Chamber of Chat was awarded Adobe Site of the day. Chamber of chat has also been awarded a place among the SmartFoxServer Showcase. "Chamber of Chat is an MMO community inspired to the magic worlds of the Harry Potter saga. The application is a great example of integration between Director/Shockwave (client) and SmartFoxServer PRO.". Chamber of Chat has been a long time associated branch of The Leaky network and although as part of the network with The Leaky Cauldron, Pottercast and "Ask Peeves" search engine, it was ranked number two behind Indiana Jones's TheRaider.Net out of 25 essential fansites of "The Best of the Web" by Entertainment Weekly in December 2007.

Other sites use modified versions of phpBB that allow for a certain level of interactive roleplaying and are what is commonly referred to as "forum-based roleplaying". Interactive gaming can include player versus player features, a form of currency for making purchases in stores, and non-player characters such as monsters that must be fought to gain levels and experience points. However, these features are more prevalent in games that are not forum-based. Advancement in such games is usually dependent on live chat, multiplayer cooperation, and fighting as opposed to taking classes or simply posting to earn points for one's "house"; like at Hogwarts, players in forum-based games are sometimes sorted into a different group distinguishing different values within a person.

== Landmarks tours ==
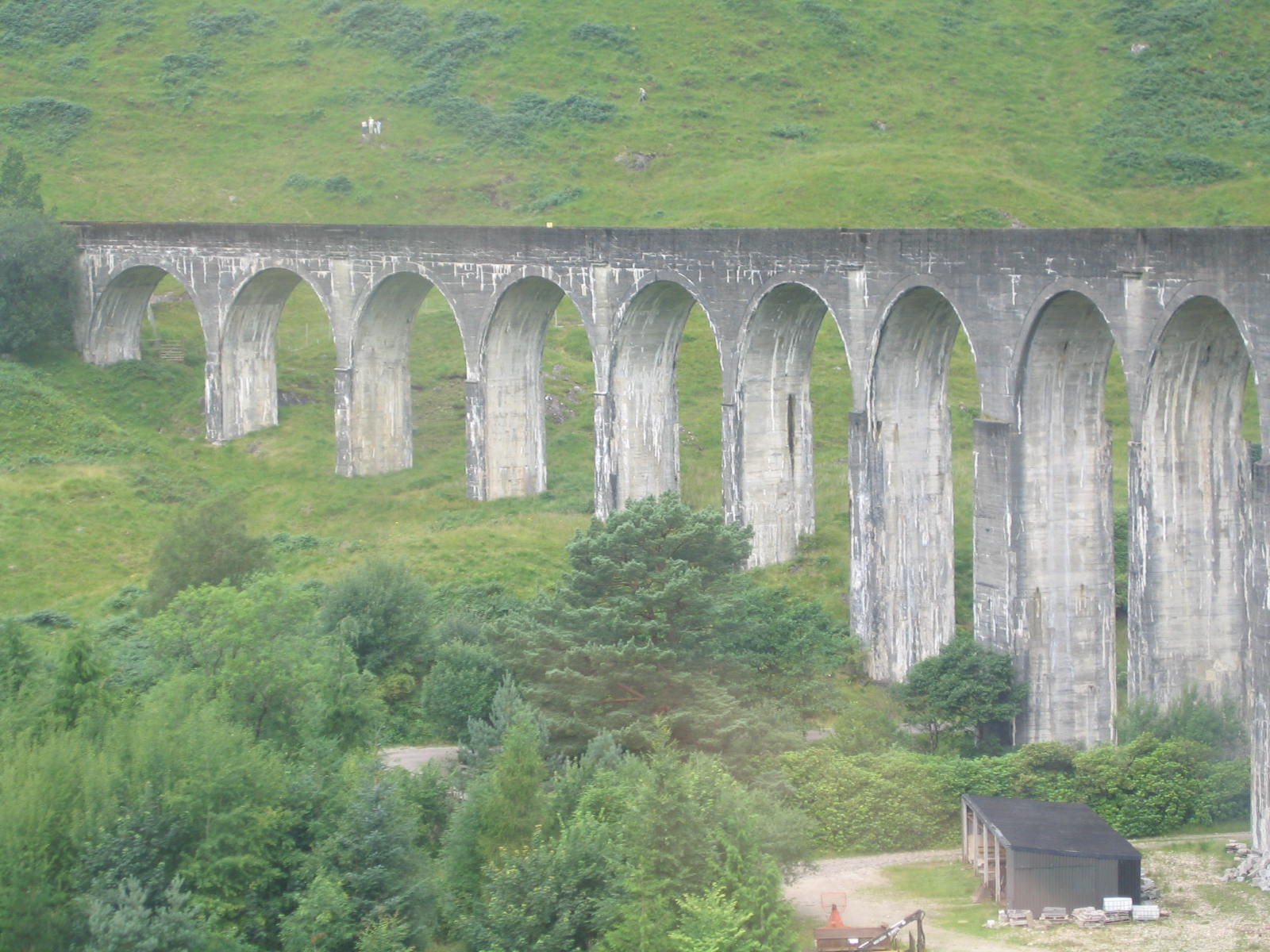
The Glenfinnan viaduct, which the Hogwarts Express passes over when it travels to Hogwarts in the films.

Some travel agencies have organised a subdivision to create tours specifically highlighting iconic landmarks in the world of Harry Potter. HP Fan Trips, offered by Beyond Boundaries Travel since 2004 in conjunction with fan site HPANA, was designed by and for fans of the series, and tours noteworthy Potter-related locations in the United Kingdom. Since 2004, they have exclusively chartered steam locomotive #5972 Olton Hall, the locomotive used in the films as the Hogwarts Express, as well as the carriages labeled as such and seen in the movies. The travel agency Your Man in Europe began hosting Magical Tours in 2006, in conjunction with fan site MuggleNet. They offer four different tours through England and Scotland.

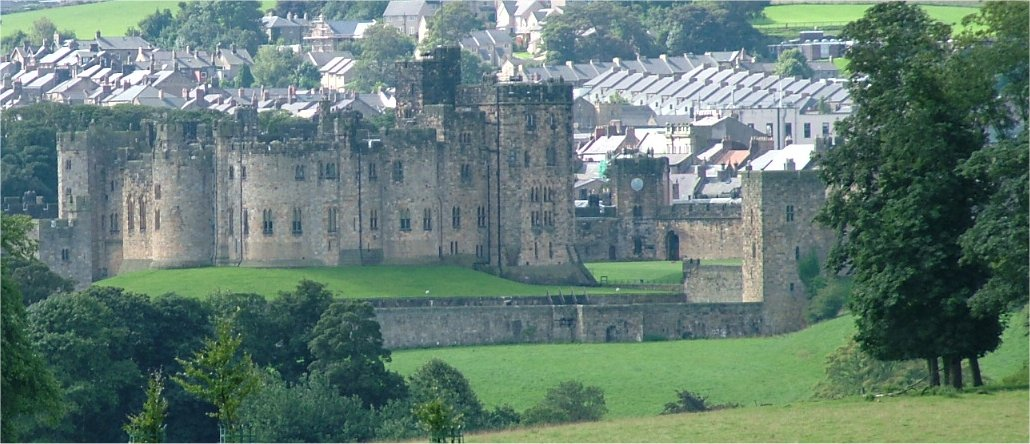
Alnwick Castle, the castle used for filming exterior shots of Hogwarts in the Potter films.

These tours primarily feature locations used for shooting in the films, though some trips include a Chinese restaurant in Edinburgh, which was once Nicholson's Cafe, where Rowling wrote much of the manuscript for Harry Potter and the Philosopher's Stone, and Edinburgh Castle, where Rowling read from the sixth book on the night of its release to an audience of children. Filming locations visited include Alnwick Castle, where some exterior locations of Hogwarts are shot, places in Fort William, Scotland; Glen Nevis, Scotland; the Glenfinnan viaduct; Christ Church Cathedral in Oxford and the Cloisters located within New College, Oxford.

== Wizard rock ==
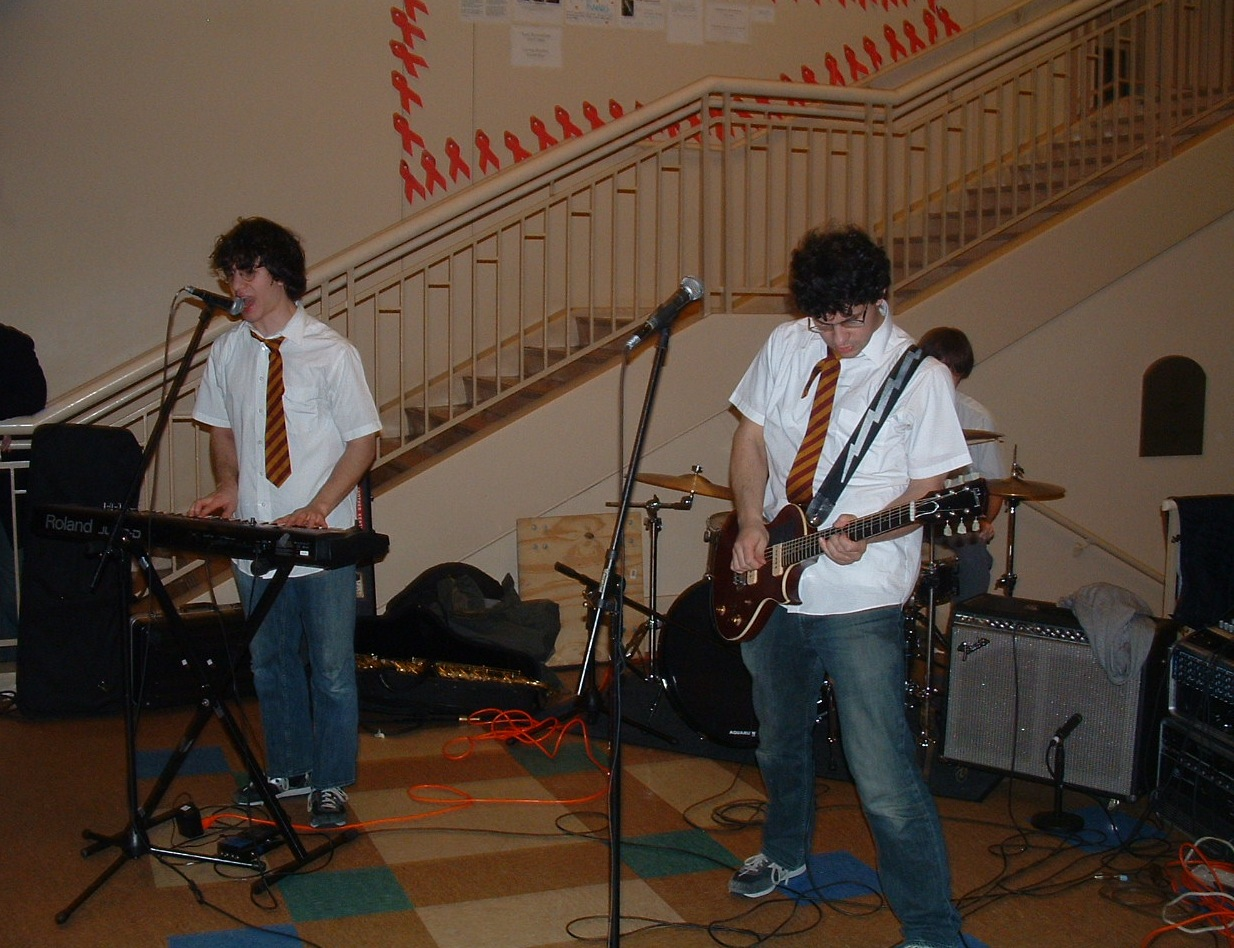
Harry and the Potters perform at the Horace Mann School in Riverdale, Bronx, New York.

Wizard music (sometimes shorthanded as Wrock) is a musical movement dating from 2000 in Massachusetts with Harry and the Potters, though it has grown internationally and has expanded to at least 750 bands. Wrock bands mostly consist of young musicians that write and perform songs about the Harry Potter universe, and these songs are often written from the point of view of a particular character in the books, usually the character who features in the band's name. If they are performing live, they may also cosplay, or dress as, that character.

In contrast to mainstream bands that have some songs incorporating literary references among a wider repertoire of music (notably Led Zeppelin to The Lord of the Rings), wizard rock bands take their inspiration entirely from the Harry Potter universe. In preserving the promotion of reading, too, bands like to perform in libraries, bookstores, and schools. The bands have also performed at the fan conventions.

== Documentaries ==
=== We Are Wizards ===
We Are Wizards is a feature-length documentary by Josh Koury about the Harry Potter fandom. It features Wizard rock bands Harry and the Potters, Draco and the Malfoys, The Hungarian Horntails, and The Whomping Willows. The film also features Heather Lawver, Melissa Anelli, and Brad Neely. We Are Wizards had its World Premiere at the SXSW film festival in 2008, then traveled to 20 film festivals worldwide. The film opened theatrically in 5 cities on 14 November 2008. The film can be seen on Hulu.com, and DVD.

=== The Fandom Fan Diaries: Wizard's Gone W!ld ===
The Fandom Fan Diaries: Wizard's Gone W!ld is a documentary web series that is based on fandom submissions. The producers Miranda Marshall and Amy Henderson starting accepting video submissions in early March 2009 and plan to accept them through 2013. WiZarDs Gone W!LD is affiliated with The Fan Book of HP Fans, yet another fandom project based on submissions that has recently extended its submission deadline date.

=== The Wizard Rockumentary ===
The Wizard Rockumentary: A Movie about Rocking and Rowling is a feature documentary chronicling the rise of Harry Potter tribute bands. Producers Megan and Mallory Schuyler travelled around the United States compiling interviews and concert footage of bands including Harry and the Potters, Draco and the Malfoys, The Remus Lupins, The Whomping Willow, The Moaning Myrtles, Roonil Wazlib, Snidget, and The Hermione Crookshanks Experience. The film was released in April 2008 and has screened in libraries around the country. The producers are currently negotiating broadcast and home video rights.

=== Proyecto Patronus ===
Project Patronus: Magic of a Generation (Proyecto Patronus: la magia de una generación) is a Spanish documentary based on the Harry Potter franchise. It covers the franchise's influence on a generation of young people, and deals with the multiple values, such as friendship, love, courage and respect, which are reflected in the books. Numerous professionals in psychology and pedagogy who have studied the significance of the franchise appear. The film was released in 2016 and has screened in film festivals around Spain.

== Health ==
In 2003, Dr. Howard J. Bennett coined the term "Hogwarts headache" in a letter to the New England Journal of Medicine shortly after the release of the longest book in the series, Order of the Phoenix. He described it as a mild condition, a tension headache possibly accompanied by neck or wrist pains, caused by unhealthily long reading sessions of Harry Potter. The symptoms resolved themselves within days of finishing the book. His prescription of taking reading breaks was rejected by two of the patients on which he discovered this headache.

Researchers at John Radcliffe Hospital in Oxford found in 2005 that the admission rate of children with traumatic injuries to the city's ERs plummeted on the publication weekends of both Order of the Phoenix and Half-Blood Prince. This was due to the volume of children reading Harry Potter rather than engaging in riskier outdoor activities, such as riding of bicycles and scooters, climbing trees or playing sports. The study was led by Dr. Stephen Gwilym whose paper "hypothesized that there is a place for a committee of safety-conscious, talented writers who could produce high quality books for the purpose of injury prevention," noting a potential problem with this strategy: "Obviously, if children are always in reading books and not outside getting exercise, there is a long-term risk of obesity, rickets and lack of sunlight."

== Political responses ==
Some Harry Potter fans have been voicing concerns about Rowling's political views since at least the spring of 2018. In 2020, fan websites The Leaky Cauldron and MuggleNet said they would no longer provide links to Rowling's website or use photos of the author, in light of the various controversies around Rowling's views on transgender people.

== See also ==
- Muggle
