= Harry Potter: A History of Magic =

British Library and New-York Historical Society exhibition

Harry Potter: A History of Magic is an exhibition of real-world magical artefacts and history presented alongside artefacts from the development of J.K. Rowling's fictional Harry Potter series. The exhibition originally opened at the British Library in 2017, as part of celebrations for the 20th anniversary of the publication of Harry Potter and the Philosopher's Stone. It is also available online through the Google Arts & Culture platform and was presented at the New-York Historical Society beginning in October 2018. Two official publications, Harry Potter: A History of Magic and Harry Potter: A Journey Through a History of Magic, along with a BBC television documentary, were created in conjunction with the exhibition.

== The exhibitions ==
=== British Library exhibition ===
The exhibition at the British Library was open to the public from 20 October 2017 to 28 February 2018. The British Library also installed smaller displays on the same topic in 22 libraries across the United Kingdom. The British exhibition was a collaboration between the British Library, Bloomsbury (publisher of the Harry Potter series in the United Kingdom), and author J. K. Rowling. Among the real-world artefacts displayed were a Ripley Scroll (which describes the process of making a philosopher's stone) and Nicolas Flamel's headstone. Items dealing with Rowling's fictional Wizarding World included original drafts of the Harry Potter books and original artwork by Rowling. The artefacts were organized around class topics (such as Herbology and Care of Magical Creatures) offered at Hogwarts, a wizarding school featured in the Harry Potter series.

=== Google Arts & Culture exhibition ===
On 27 February 2018, just as the British Library was preparing to close the original exhibition, Google made the exhibition available online world-wide using their Google Arts & Culture platform. The online exhibition is an interactive recreation of the British Library version of the exhibition, including images of the same artefacts. The exhibition features 360 panoramic Street View style photos which were produced by London based panoramic photographer, Ben Smart.

=== New-York Historical Society exhibition ===
The New-York Historical Society's version of the exhibition opened New York City on 5 October 2018 (through 27 January 2019), as part of 20th anniversary celebrations of the publication of Harry Potter and the Sorcerer's Stone in the United States. While some of the same artefacts from the British exhibition were displayed, additional materials dealing with real-word magic in the Americas were shown. Scholastic Corporation (publisher of the Harry Potter series in the United States) collaborated on the exhibit, and artefacts dealing with the series' publication in the US were displayed.

== Companion publications ==
=== Harry Potter: A History of Magic ===
The Bloomsbury edition of Harry Potter: A History of Magic (ISBN 9781408890769) is a 256-page hardcover book geared towards older readers (as opposed to the exhibition's other official publication). As a companion to the exhibition, the book contains images and descriptions of all 150 artefacts displayed in the British exhibition, along with short essays comparing real-word magical practices to those found in the Harry Potter series. Included are images of several pieces of artwork by Rowling and a few pages of drafts for various Harry Potter books. Like the exhibition, the book is divided into chapters based on classes at Hogwarts. It was published 20 October 2017, in conjunction with the opening of the exhibition at the British Library, and is available in the United Kingdom. With the release of the physical book, a digital e-book edition (ISBN 9781781109472) was published by Pottermore. Pottermore also published an enhanced e-book edition available through Apple's iBooks. On 18 October 2018 Bloomsbury published a softcover version of this book (ISBN 9781526607072).

A Scholastic edition (ISBN 9781338311501) was published in October 2018, in conjunction with the opening of the exhibition at the New-York Historical Society, and is available in the United States. With the release of the physical book, a digital e-book edition (ISBN 9781781102596) was published by Pottermore. The Scholastic edition of this publication was modified to coincide with the artefacts displayed in the New York exhibition.

=== Harry Potter: A Journey Through a History of Magic ===
The Bloomsbury edition of Harry Potter: A Journey Through a History of Magic (ISBN 9781408890776) is a 144-page softcover book geared towards younger audiences. This book also includes images and descriptions of artefacts displayed in the British exhibition, including some of Rowling's original works, although due to its smaller size there are less artefacts featured than found in the exhibition's other official publication. The text of this book is written for readers eight years of age and older. It was published 20 October 2017, in conjunction with the opening of the exhibition at the British Library, and is available in the United Kingdom. With the release of the physical book, a digital e-book edition (ISBN 9781781109496) was published by Pottermore.

The Scholastic edition of Harry Potter: A Journey Through a History of Magic (ISBN 9781338267105) was published in the United States on 20 October 2017, in conjunction with the opening of the British exhibition. With the release of the physical book, a digital e-book edition (ISBN 9781781109502) was published by Pottermore. Other than a different cover, Scholastic did not make any major edits to the US version of this book.

=== Harry Potter: A History of Magic (Television Documentary) ===
The BBC produced an hour-long television documentary examining the British exhibition. Titled Harry Potter: A History of Magic, the documentary premiered in the United Kingdom on BBC Two on 28 October 2017. It is narrated by Imelda Staunton, who played Dolores Umbridge in the Harry Potter film series, and was released 27 November 2017 on region 2 DVD.

The documentary premiered in the United States on 11 April 2018 on The CW. The region 1 DVD was released on 30 October 2018 and it is also available on Amazon Prime Video and the BBC Select streaming channel.

=== Audiobook ===
An audiobook of the same name was released in 2018. The audiobook is narrated by Natalie Dormer – with input from a host of experts – and reveals some of the hidden stories behind real-world magic and explores some of J.K. Rowling's magical inventions alongside their folkloric, cultural and historical forebears.
