= Quidditch Through the Ages =

2001 book by J. K. Rowling

- Author: J. K. Rowling (credited as Kennilworthy Whisp)
- Cover artist: Richard Horne
- Series: Harry Potter
- Genre: Fantasy
- Publisher: Bloomsbury (UK) (Canada 2010–present); Arthur A. Levine/ Scholastic (US); Raincoast (Canada 1998–2010)
- Publication date: 12 March 2001
- Pages: 56
- ISBN: 978-1338340563

Quidditch Through the Ages is a 2001 book written by British author J. K. Rowling using the pseudonym of Kennilworthy Whisp about Quidditch in the Harry Potter universe. It purports to be the Hogwarts library's copy of the in-universe book of the same name mentioned in several novels of the Harry Potter series.

The book benefits the BBC affiliated charity Comic Relief. Over 80% of the cover price of each book sold goes directly to poor children in various places around the world.

== Synopsis ==
In 2001, Rowling penned two companion books to the Harry Potter series, Quidditch Through the Ages and Fantastic Beasts and Where to Find Them, for British charity and offshoot of Live Aid, Comic Relief with all of her royalties going to the charity. As of July 2008, the books combined are estimated to have earned over $30 million for Comic Relief. The two books have since been made available in hardcover.

== Audiobook adaptation ==
The book was recorded as an unabridged audiobook in 2018 and read by Andrew Lincoln. The Audible version of the audiobook also includes over an hour and a half of bonus content. This includes the history of the Quidditch World Cup – written for Pottermore by J. K. Rowling in 2014 – narrated by Andrew Lincoln, and the Daily Prophet's coverage of the 2014 Quidditch World Cup – also written by J. K. Rowling – narrated by Imogen Church (in the character of Ginny Potter) and Annette Badland (as Rita Skeeter).

In 2019, the American Library Association named it one of the top ten Amazing Audiobooks for Young Adults.

== Fictional book ==
Within the fictional world of Harry Potter, Quidditch Through the Ages is written by Kennilworthy Whisp, a renowned Quidditch expert.

In both the fictional and real-world it is the definitive handbook on the history and intricacies of the game. It also serves as a catalogue of the many British Quidditch teams. When Severus Snape caught Harry outside the school with this book in Harry Potter and the Philosopher's Stone, he invented the rule that no library books were allowed outside the school and confiscated it.

=== Kennilworthy Whisp ===
In the Harry Potter universe, Kennilworthy Whisp is a Quidditch expert and fanatic who has written many books about the sport. He lives in Nottinghamshire, where he divides his time with "wherever the Wigtown Wanderers are playing this week." His hobbies include backgammon, vegetarian cookery, and collecting vintage broomsticks. According to Whisp, the Firebolt/Nimbus 2000 is the best broomstick.

== See also ==
- Fantastic Beasts and Where to Find Them (book) which also benefits Comic Relief by more than 80% of the cover price
