= Richard Fish =

Richard Fish may refer to:

- Richard Fish (character), a character in the television series Ally McBeal
- Richard Fish (politician) in 40th New York State Legislature
- Richard Fish (actor), see List of Harry Potter cast members

== See also ==
- Richard Fish Cadle, American Episcopalian priest
- Richard Fisk, fictional character
- While Ricky Fish Was Sleeping, book published by David Lapham
