= MuggleNet =

Harry Potter fansite

- Company type: For-profit domestic corporation
- Available in: English (U.S.)
- Headquarters: New York, New York, United States
- Website: www.mugglenet.com
- Commercial: Yes
- Registration: Optional
- Launched: October 1999; 26 years ago (Incorporated in 2007)

MuggleNet is the Internet's oldest and largest Harry Potter and Wizarding World fansite. MuggleNet was founded in 1999. It has expanded over the years to include a handful of partner podcasts, a separate book blog, over half a dozen published works and live events. At one point, it also ran its own forums, social network and separate fan fiction website. Originally owned by founder Emerson Spartz, MuggleNet became an independently owned and operated brand in early 2020.

== Relationship with the franchise ==
MuggleNet once benefitted from friendly relations with J.K. Rowling, the author of the Harry Potter books, and the producers of the films. She has praised MuggleNet on her website and awarded it her Fan Site Award. Rowling has recounted on her website that she visited the site and sometimes read comments left by visitors, although she never commented herself. The author stated in a 2004 post on her website that she visited the site's chat room and was snubbed when she anonymously joined a conversation about Harry Potter theories.

In July 2005, Rowling invited Spartz and Melissa Anelli, of the Leaky Cauldron, to Edinburgh, Scotland, for an interview at her home on the release of Harry Potter and the Half-Blood Prince. J.K. Rowling mentioned MuggleNet through the interactive Harry Potter website Pottermore in September 2013, saying how proud she was to own the key to La Porte, Indiana, hometown of MuggleNet founder Emerson Spartz.

Warner Bros., the producers of the Harry Potter movies, regularly sent MuggleNet stills taken from the upcoming movies before they were released. The studio also provided MuggleNet staff with advance views of the new official website designs, as well as included staff in a video conference to discuss the Harry Potter theme park at Universal Orlando Resort. Universal has extended invitations to MuggleNet to attend the opening of the Wizarding World of Harry Potter at Universal Studios Hollywood in addition to the opening of Diagon Alley and Hagrid's Magical Creatures Motorbike Adventure at Universal Orlando Resort.

In July 2020, MuggleNet, together with the Leaky Cauldron, took several steps to distance themselves from Rowling due to comments she made the previous month that they perceived as transphobic. In a joint statement, the sites wrote that her views were "out of step with the message of acceptance and empowerment we find in her books and celebrated by the Harry Potter community". They announced that they would no longer use photos of the author, link to her website, or write about achievements unrelated to the Potterverse. In January 2021, MuggleNet promised to no longer provide news coverage of J.K. Rowling's works set outside of the wizarding world. The next month, that policy was updated to state that MuggleNet would no longer provide editorial coverage of J.K. Rowling's works set outside of the wizarding world "unless related to works set within the wizarding world."

== Podcasts ==
=== MuggleCast ===
MuggleCast launched in August 2005 when podcasts were still up and coming. Inspired by the passion within the Harry Potter community, MuggleNet staff members Andrew Sims, Ben Schoen, and Kevin Steck created a short podcast to discuss some of the recent Harry Potter news and the just-released Harry Potter and the Half-Blood Prince. Following Sims's departure from the site in summer 2011, MuggleCast separated from MuggleNet to become an independent podcast. The hosts now discuss the Fantastic Beasts films, the Wizarding World of Harry Potter theme parks, and fandom news, along with continued discussion of the original Harry Potter series.

MuggleCast recorded what it announced would be its final regular episode on August 26, 2013. However, on December 27, 2014, it was announced that they would be returning to regular episodes. MuggleCast began posting weekly podcasts again in April 2017. It is currently hosted by Andrew Sims, Eric Scull, Micah Tannenbaum, and Laura Tee. In September 2019, MuggleCast was featured in an article in The Oprah Magazine: "26 of the Best Book Podcasts to Listen to When You're Not Reading".

== Published works ==
In 2006, in advance of the arrival of Harry Potter and the Deathly Hallows, five MuggleNet staff members (Andy Gordon, Jamie Lawrence, Ben Schoen, Emerson Spartz, and Gretchen Stull) coauthored the reference book What Will Happen in Harry Potter 7: Who Lives, Who Dies, Who Falls in Love, and How Will the Adventure Finally End, which was a published collection of unofficial fan predictions. By July 21, 2007, the book had sold 335,000 copies and reached #2 on the New York Times Children's Best Seller list, where it spent six months. In 2009, Emerson Spartz and Ben Schoen penned another book, MuggleNet.com's Harry Potter Should Have Died: Controversial Views from the #1 Fan Site.

== In popular culture ==
In 2010, MuggleNet, along with several groups in the Harry Potter fandom, created a four-hour event called Helping Haiti Heal, with all proceeds going to Partners in Health to help provide health care to areas without reliable medical care following the disastrous earthquake that hit the country that year.

In October 2007, Jimmy Kimmel Live! did a parody of Emerson Spartz's recent interview on the "Geraldo" segment of Fox News. Both the original interview and the parody discussed J. K. Rowling's recent outing of Headmaster of Hogwarts Albus Dumbledore.

In 2012, Mugglenet published an April Fools' Day post suggesting that then British Prime Minister David Cameron was declaring May 2 as "International Harry Potter Day" to commemorate the Battle of Hogwarts, a claim that in the years since has since been falsely cited as true by some media outlets.

== See also ==
- Harry Potter fandom
