= Harry Potter Fan Zone =

Harry Potter Australian fansite

- Website type: Fansite
- Owner: Andy McCray
- Creator: Andy McCray
- Website: www.harrypotterfanzone.com
- Launched: 22 December 2003

Harry Potter Fan Zone is an Australian Harry Potter fansite created in 2003 by Australian teenager Andy McCray. Harry Potter author J. K. Rowling awarded the website a "Fan Site Award", stating that "[it] is a great Australian site with an impressively young staff who have produced some really insightful editorials."

== Overview ==
Harry Potter Fan Zone's main focus is the coverage of Harry Potter news and Harry Potter related discussion and contents. The site has covered events in the United States, United Kingdom and Australia, including book releases, movie releases, premieres and fan gatherings. At the invitation of Warner Bros., it has covered the US and UK premieres of the last six Harry Potter films and has twice visited Leavesden Studios to report on Harry Potter filming. The website has also been selected for preservation in the Pandora Archive by the National Library of Australia.

The site has had the opportunity to interview many of the cast and crew involved in the Harry Potter film franchise, including Daniel Radcliffe, Rupert Grint, Tom Felton, Evanna Lynch, Andy Linden, James Walters, Jamie Waylett and crew members David Yates, David Heyman and David Barron. Additionally, J. K. Rowling answered questions from an open letter written by the site.

== See also ==
- Harry Potter fandom
