= MuggleCast =

Podcast

- Genre: Harry Potter
- Format: Audio; Video

Cast and voices
- Hosted by: Eric Scull; Andrew Sims; Micah Tannenbaum; Laura Thompson

Technical specifications
- Video format: Patreon
- Audio format: MP3

Publication
- No. of episodes: 733
- Original release: August 7, 2005

Reception
- Ratings: 4.857142857142857/5

Related
- Website: www.mugglecast.com

MuggleCast is a Harry Potter podcast that is hosted by Eric Scull, Andrew Sims, Micah Tannenbaum, and Laura Thompson. Sims came up with the idea for the podcast and pitched it to the founder of MuggleNet, Emerson Spartz, who originally thought it was a bad idea. It was the first MuggleNet podcast and was released on August 7, 2005, and was hosted by Ben Schoen, Sims, and Kevin Steck.

After the release of the Harry Potter and the Deathly Hallows and before the announcement of Fantastic Beasts and Where to Find Them (film) the hosts announced that they were ending the show and put out a finale episode on August 26, 2013. However, less than a month later, the hosts released another episode discussing the announcement of the aforementioned Fantastic Beasts series. A little over a year later, on the December 27, 2014 episode of the show, it was announced that the show would return to releasing regular episodes.

The show was launched as part of MuggleNet but split from the site in 2011.

== Awards ==
- MuggleCast won the 2006 Podcast Awards in the Peoples Choice category.
- MuggleCast was nominated for Fav Podcast in the Nickelodeon Australian Kids' Choice Awards 2006.

== Recognition ==
- Oprah Daily featured MuggleCast in its list of "26 of the Best Book Podcasts to Listen to When You're Not Reading".
- Bustle ranked MuggleCast third in their list of "Podcasts Every Harry Potter Fan Needs In Their Life".
- Culture Whispirer ranked Mugglecast in their list of "The best podcasts for kids to listen to when stuck indoors".
- The Bookseller lists MuggleCast in their list of "10 books and publishing podcasts".

== Interviews ==
The show has had on a number of notable members of the Wizarding World franchise such as:

- Arthur Bowen
- Jim Dale
- Warwick Davis
- Patrick Doyle
- Will Dunn
- Mary GrandPré
- David Heyman
- Evanna Lynch
- Arthur Parsons
- Oliver Phelps
- David Yates
