= J. K. Rowling: The Wizard Behind Harry Potter =

2000 biography by Marc Shapiro

J.K. Rowling: The Wizard Behind Harry Potter
- Cover art of the first edition
- Author: Marc Shapiro
- Language: English
- Genre: Biography
- Publisher: St. Martin's Griffin
- Publication date: 2000
- Publication place: United States
- Media type: Print (paperback)

J.K. Rowling: The Wizard Behind Harry Potter is a 2000 unauthorized biography of J. K. Rowling by Marc Shapiro, published by St. Martin's Griffin. The book reached #4 on The New York Times Children's Bestseller list.

The book focuses on Rowling's life and the success of the Harry Potter series, and was described as an attempt to capitalize on the franchise's popularity.

== Reception ==
The book received generally negative reviews. The Toronto Star called it a "celebrity rip-off" and a "shameless bid to cash in," while The Birmingham News wrote that it contained little new information and relied heavily on previously published material. A The Washington Post article similarly found that it offered little beyond widely available information. The book has also been discussed in the The Buffalo News, The Journal News, Jackson Citizen Patriot, and The Clifton Journal.

== See also ==
- Harry Potter franchise
- J. K. Rowling
