= Potterless =

American podcast about Harry Potter

- Genre: Comedy, Literature
- Language: English

Creative team
- Created by: Mike Schubert

Cast and voices
- Hosted by: Mike Schubert

Music
- Theme music composed by: Bettina Campomanes

Production
- Production: Mike Schubert

Publication
- No. of episodes: 213 (plus bonus episodes) (as of Oct 23, 2026)
- Original release: October 17, 2016
- Provider: Multitude
- Updates: Randomly posting

Related
- Website: potterlesspodcast.com

Potterless is an audio podcast created by Mike Schubert. The podcast follows Schubert as he reads the Harry Potter series for the first time. Each episode covers a section of the book series and later the movies and fan material as Schubert and one or more guests analyze the story, writing, and characters.

== History ==
Schubert wanted to start a podcast believing that an adult reading the series for the first time would be an interesting topic. He invited fans of the series on as guests as counterpoint to his experience. The podcast was conceptualized as one that would "pick apart the story and dethrone it from its lofty perch" but turns into one that "celebrates as the story gets richer."

The first episode of the podcast launched in October 2016. Episodes were initially released bi-weekly, but the release schedule was switched to weekly in 2019. The last book material was covered in episode 89, after which Schubert began covering the Harry Potter films and spin-off materials such as Harry Potter and the Cursed Child. The last regular episode of Potterless was released on August 30, 2021.

Schubert then moved onto the Percy Jackson series by Rick Riordan for his next podcast with a similar concept; this podcast's first full episode was released on September 6, 2021, and is named The Newest Olympian. Schubert still releases content for Potterless from events such as live shows.

Besides The Newest Olympian, Schubert hosts or co-hosts five other podcasts: Horse, Meddling Adults, Modern Muckraker, Professional Talkers, and The Last and the Curious.

On October 4, 2022, it was announced by Multitude, the podcast network which hosted Potterless, that Schubert and his shows had left the production company.

== Format ==
Each episode of the first 89 is dedicated to a chapter or chapters of the book series in chronological reading order. After Schubert finished the books, the episodes moved to discussing the movies. Later, he discussed other Harry Potter-related media, such as the spin-off books and movies, A Very Potter Musical, and Puffs. Episodes are approximately 60 minutes in length, and consist primarily of Schubert and his guest(s) summarizing the plot and providing commentary.

Recurring segments include British Quandaries, in which British citizen Dottie James answers questions from Schubert and his American guests regarding "British-isms".

Schubert donates a portion of his Patreon revenues to charity.

== Reception ==
Potterless has been featured by BuzzFeed in lists of recommended podcasts.

The Post called Potterless "the perfect podcast for anyone who has wanted to reread the series but doesn't have the time… [it] provides listeners with opportunity to recall the first time they read the books and follow along on the beautiful journey of listening to someone else do the same." Brighton Journal wrote that Schubert's "genuine enthusiasm for the books is charming."

The Maine Campus called Schubert "cynical" and "too critical." The Student said Schubert's "complete lack of understanding of everyday British words and phrases threatens to irritate rather than amuse."
