= Wizarding World Digital =

Warner Bros. media franchise website

Harry Potter Digital
- Company type: Private
- Website type: Harry Potter website
- Available in: English, German, Spanish, French, Italian, Japanese, and only e-books and digital audiobooks in Portuguese.
- Area served: Worldwide
- Owner: J. K. Rowling
- Founder: J. K. Rowling
- Key people: J. K. Rowling; Neil Blair
- Website: harrypotter.com (October 2024 to present) wizardingworld.com (until October 2024) pottermore.com (until October 2019)
- Registration: Not required to read content. Required to be sorted.
- Launched: 31 July 2011 (beta as Pottermore.com); 14 April 2012 (full launch); 22 September 2015 (redesign); 2 October 2019 (relaunch as WizardingWorld.com)

Harry Potter Digital (formerly known as Wizarding World Digital) is a digital publishing, e-commerce, entertainment and news company, now trading as HarryPotter.com. It offers news, features, and articles as well as new and previously unreleased writing by J. K. Rowling regarding the Wizarding World. The site features Rowling's thoughts, and a sales resource for e-book and audiobook versions of the seven Harry Potter novels through Pottermore Publishing.

On 31 July 2011, registration for the limited beta of a website named Pottermore began. The limited release allowed the first million fans registered to complete The Magical Quill challenge. The original registration was intended to be October 2011, but was delayed until 14 April 2012. Pottermore was originally launched in partnership with Sony, but in April 2014, it was announced that Pottermore had concluded its relationship with Sony and entered its next developmental phase both creatively and commercially. On 22 September 2015, Pottermore launched a newly designed site containing news, features, and articles plus previously unreleased writing by J.K. Rowling and removed some features including the interactive Moment illustrations, House Cup, and Sorting ceremony. A newly designed Sorting Ceremony was subsequently launched in January 2016 in which users could reclaim their old house or be re-sorted.

The Pottermore website was rebranded first as WizardingWorld.com in 2019 and then as HarryPotter.com in 2024, to which a large part of the content has been migrated.

== Development ==
Pottermore was incorporated in April 2008 and was in a developmental stage for two years. The Leaky Cauldron's webmaster, Melissa Anelli, has been involved with the project since October 2009. On 15 June 2011, various Harry Potter fansites began releasing coordinates that led to letters on SecretStreetView.com. This website, created by Rowling, used Google Maps to reveal hidden letters that spelled out the title of her secret announcement. The first web page to announce the project appeared in June 2011. The webpage linked to a YouTube channel that featured a countdown. Pixelated owls gathered on multiple Harry Potter websites that linked to this countdown page. Rowling also revealed some details about the new site in a YouTube video on 23 June 2011.

=== Early registration: The Magical Quill Challenge ===
When the website was launched on 31 July 2011, an overwhelming number of people tried to access it. Those who could get into Pottermore were informed of The Magical Quill Challenge. Users that completed the challenge could compete for the early registration for the site. The challenge spanned across seven days, with each day corresponding to a certain book in the series. Each day had a new clue, which had to be solved by the user in order to enable their right to register before October. The website picked a user's name randomly. Only a certain number of people each day were allowed to use the Magic Quill clue for registration, but this quickly added up to a total of one million users at the end of the challenge (6 August 2011). While many accounts were created by fans during the early registration phase, many other users created multiple accounts and sold them for high prices on eBay. This was done despite the warning given by the Pottermore blog, and the fact that users were assured that the website would remain a free site. Some of these accounts were created by cyber criminals hoping to target as many Harry Potter fans as possible. These criminals posted promises of early previews and access to the site, which led people to unintentionally buy a malicious software and allowed hackers to gain access to their accounts. Clues on the first three days were more difficult than the clues on days four through seven. For North Americans, the final clue was released on 5 August 2011 instead of 6 August 2011. The following table is an overview of the Magical Quill Challenge.

Date	Time	Clue	Answer	Page	References
31 July	9:00 a.m. BST	"How many owls are on the Eeylops Owl Emporium sign? Multiply by 49."	245	Sony's US homepage	
1 August	10:00 a.m. BST	"What is the number of the chapter in which Professor McGonagall cancels the Quidditch match between Gryffindor and Hufflepuff? Multiply this number by 42."	588	Harry Potter and the Deathly Hallows – Part 2, site hidden in the photos of the film.	
2 August	11:00 a.m. BST	"In the Gryffindor versus Slytherin Quidditch match in Harry's third year, how many points ahead is Gryffindor before Harry catches the golden snitch? Multiply this number by 35."	2100	Online article on The Guardian's website	
3 August	3:30 p.m. BST	"How many students take part in the Triwizard Tournament during Harry's fourth year? Multiply this number by 28."	112	Sony Harry Potter page, later skipped due to issues	
4 August	6:00 p.m. BST	"What is the house number of the headquarters for The Order of the Phoenix in Grimmauld Place? Multiply this number by 21."	252	Scholastic's Harry Potter page in an ad space at the top of the page.	
5 August	2:00 p.m. BST	"How many chapters are there in Harry Potter and the Half-Blood Prince? Multiply this number by 14."	420	The Wizarding World of Harry Potter's website	
6 August	1:00 a.m. BST	"How many Deathly Hallows are there? Multiply this number by 7."	21	Warner Brothers' Parseltongue Translator	

=== Beta release ===
"I think Pottermore has the potential to be a lasting focal point for the Harry Potter brand. I think the fact that it incorporates new content, a social networking element, and is also the only place people will be able to buy the eBooks will prove to be quite a potent combination..."

— Charlotte Williams, The Bookseller

On 10 August 2011, Pottermore sent a congratulatory email to registered users that confirmed early entry. This signified that the beta period began once the sign-in button reappeared on the website. On 15 August 2011, the sign-in button reappeared, welcome emails were sent out, and the beta period began. A very small number of users were invited to begin their use of Pottermore on the first day. More users were invited until 27 September, that marked when the final invitation emails were sent. Early users also said that even though the site did not bring back the same feelings of excitement from when the books were released, it did add an extra layer to the reading experience.

=== Public launch ===
Pottermore was originally scheduled to become publicly available at the end of October 2011, but the beta period was extended. The Pottermore Shop (which sells Harry Potter eBooks and digital audio books) became available on 27 March 2012. On 8 March 2012, it was reported that Pottermore would open to the public in early April 2012. The website officially opened on 14 April 2012, but at that time, the interactive experience was only available for Harry Potter and the Philosopher's Stone.

== Features of Pottermore (2011–2015) ==
=== Exploring the books ===
Pottermore visitors could participate in interactive reading. They would create an account and be given a unique username. They began with Harry Potter and the Philosopher's Stone and go through the chapters, following Harry and his friends through several Hogwarts journeys. They could collect things like potion ingredients, books, Chocolate Frog cards, galleons, candy, and more along the way. These various finds would earn users points for their house, after they are sorted by the Sorting Hat. The Sorting Hat would place them in one of the four different houses at Hogwarts. The user was given a special quiz to determine in which house they belong. The four different houses in the Harry Potter universe are Hufflepuff, Gryffindor, Slytherin, and Ravenclaw. Users could visit Diagon Alley, where they could purchase different wizarding supplies for school. They could learn spells, duel with other users, and brew several different potions. Students from different Houses could compete with each other for the House Cup by earning House points through dueling, potion making and collecting objects for the first time.

==== Philosopher's Stone ====
The entire first book was available on launch.

==== Chamber of Secrets ====
On 15 July 2012, the first four chapters of Harry Potter and the Chamber of Secrets were released to only Slytherin House, as their reward for winning the first house cup; it was released to the other Houses on 16 July. On 18 September, chapters five through eleven were released. Accompanying these releases were many new features. These features included badges, the ability for users to see their own all-time House points as well as the number earned since the last House Cup, second-year schoolbooks, more galleons to spend in Diagon Alley, and a status field for user profiles. The final instalment of chapters, including chapters twelve through eighteen, were launched on 31 October 2012.

==== Prisoner of Azkaban ====
The first seven chapters of Harry Potter and the Prisoner of Azkaban were released on 20 December 2012. Chapters eight through fifteen were later released on 10 April 2013. Chapters sixteen through twenty-two were released 31 July 2013, along with a new layout of Pottermore that included a new gateway, a separate way of going through Harry's story and the user's, and three more moments added to Harry Potter and the Philosopher's Stone.

==== Goblet of Fire ====
The first 11 chapters of Harry Potter and the Goblet of Fire were released on the site in October 2013. In these chapters, users could do things from the book, such as see The Dark Mark, watch the Quidditch World Cup, and find a Chudley Cannons badge in Ron Weasley's room. Chapters 12 through 20 were released on 16 January 2014. The final chapters, Chapter 21 through 37, were released to Ravenclaw members on 30 July 2014, and then to the public on 31 July 2014. Chapters 2, 22, 29, and 33 of Goblet of Fire have no interactive moments to explore, however, their descriptions are still available to read when each chapter is clicked.

Between April and July 2014, while Chapters 21 through 37 of Goblet of Fire were in development, the site periodically released "articles" from the franchise's fictional newspaper The Daily Prophet, pertaining to 2014 Quidditch World Cup. Written in-universe by the character Ginny Weasley (by then married to Harry), the articles detailed the various matches of the sporting event between sixteen countries such as Bulgaria, the United States, Japan, and Brazil. A further article, written in-universe by reporter Rita Skeeter and released on 8 July 2014, had detailed various, never-before-seen tidbits on the lives of the story's protagonists.

==== Order of the Phoenix ====
On 17 October 2014, the Pottermore Insider introduced a Trick or Treat event that posted a new Trick or Treat daily. On even days, there would be a Trick and on odd days, a Treat. Treats consisted of a piece of artwork or sneak peek to be released in the new update on Halloween. Tricks consisted of a puzzle or game that needed to be solved to provide hints of things included in the new update. On 31 October, Pottermore released the Harry Potter and the Order of the Phoenix chapters to the online experience. In the fifth book, users could read new content from J.K. Rowling, such as Professor Umbridge's backstory, the mystery of Thestrals, and even the history of the Ministry of Magic.

==== Half-Blood Prince ====
On 5 December 2014, Pottermore gave users early access to Harry Potter and the Half-Blood Prince only if they answered a series of riddles correctly. There, the visitor could find more information about Inferi, Florean Fortescue's forgotten plot to help Harry, the Order of Merlin, Draco Malfoy's secrets, and more.

==== Deathly Hallows ====
On 23 June 2015, Pottermore gave users access to Harry Potter and the Deathly Hallows, the final book.

=== Brewing potions ===
Pottermore users could make their own potions by using three different (on-screen) cauldrons that were "made" of either pewter, brass, or copper. Each cauldron could make potions at different speeds. Pewter was the slowest cauldron and copper was the fastest cauldron. Pewter cauldrons would cost fifteen galleons, brass cauldrons 21 galleons, and copper cauldrons 25 galleons. Users could make nine different potions with ingredients that could be bought in Diagon Alley, or found while exploring the chapters. If completed successfully, each potion earns them House points. However, a potion could fail if the wrong amount of an ingredient was added. It could also ruin the cauldrons. This could happen if a user left it to brew for too long, did not keep the temperature within the correct range, stirred the potion the wrong way, or crushed ingredients too finely (or not finely enough). When this happened, the player might have up to five house points deducted.

There were three lists of potions: Magical Drafts and Potions, Moste Potente Potions, and Book of Potions. Between these lists a combined total of 15 potions were available.

=== Spells ===
Users could practice spells and later use them against other members of Pottermore in the wizard's duels. There were four spellbooks and they were The Standard Book of Spells (Grade 1), The Standard Book of Spells (Grade 2), The Dark Forces: A Guide to Self-Protection and Curses and Counter-Curses. Each spell has a different effect on the victim.

There were a total of 33 spells that are available to users.

=== House points and House Cup ===
Members of Pottermore win and lose House points as they duel, brew potions, and explore the books. These points were then added and subtracted from that member's House (Slytherin, Ravenclaw, Gryffindor, or Hufflepuff) point total. The members of each House work together to gain more points than any of the other Houses. Every so often, a House Cup was awarded to the House with the most points, after which the points were reset. The first House Cup was awarded on 5 July 2012 to Slytherin, who also received early access to the first four chapters of Harry Potter and the Chamber of Secrets. The second House Cup was awarded to Gryffindor on 21 November 2012, whose members received screen-savers and desktop backgrounds for electronic devices. The third House Cup was awarded once again to Slytherin on 25 April 2013. As a reward, Slytherins gained early access to a Montrose Magpies badge. The fourth House Cup was awarded to Hufflepuff on 12 September 2013. As a reward, all members of the Hufflepuff house gained early access to Harry Potter and the Goblet of Fire. The fifth was awarded to Ravenclaw on 30 March 2014. The reward was announced on 4 April 2014, as being members of Ravenclaw house, users will enjoy early access to the final instalment of Harry Potter and the Goblet of Fire, as well as commemorative desktop wallpapers. On 26 September 2014, Ravenclaw retained their House Cup with Gryffindor being a close second. The House Cup was next awarded on 22 May 2015, and was won by Slytherin. The final House cup was awarded on 9 September 2015 and won by Hufflepuff house.

House Cup	Date	Winning House	Reward
1	5 July 2012	Slytherin	Early access to the first four chapters of Harry Potter and the Chamber of Secrets.
2	21 November 2012	Gryffindor	Screen savers and desktop backgrounds.
3	25 April 2013	Slytherin	Early access to Montrose Magpies badge.
4	12 September 2013	Hufflepuff	Early access to Harry Potter and the Goblet of Fire.
5	30 March 2014	Ravenclaw	Early access to the final chapters of Harry Potter and the Goblet of Fire and desktop backgrounds.
6	26 September 2014	Ravenclaw	Background image of the Ravenclaw's crest made from the usernames of the top 5,000 Ravenclaw students who helped their house to victory for their electronic devices.
7	22 May 2015	Slytherin	A list of 'Famous Slytherins through the Ages'
8	9 September 2015	Hufflepuff	A list of 'Famous Hufflepuffs through the Ages'

=== Comments ===
On 13 April 2015, Pottermore announced a deactivation of their comment boards in various sections of the site.

=== Artwork ===
A UK art studio, Atomhawk Design, created drawings of key scenes from the books in two and three-dimensional styles.

== Redesigned Pottermore (2015–2019) ==
On 22 September 2015, Pottermore launched a newly designed site containing news, features and articles plus previously unreleased writing by J.K. Rowling and removed some of its most prominent features including the interactive Moment illustrations, House Cup, and Sorting Ceremony. A newly designed Sorting Ceremony was subsequently launched on 28 January 2016 in which users could reclaim their old house or be re-sorted.

Pottermore continued to add new features to the site with a focus on expanding the wizarding world via interactive features and new J.K. Rowling writing. Since the site's relaunch Pottermore revealed the origins of the Potter family, locations and information regarding wizarding schools around the world and "History of Magic in North America".

The representation of Native American beliefs, however, remained controversial and was not well received by scholars and Native Americans' rights activists. History of Magic in North America includes Rowling's fictionalized versions and inventions of "Native American Magic." Her use of Native American religious figures and symbolism from contemporary, living cultures for this work of fiction has been met with protests by Native American communities. When the work debuted in October 2016, she was accused of racial insensitivity, violation of intellectual property rights, disrespect and appropriating "Native traditions while erasing Native peoples." While usually friendly and actively engaged with her fanbase on social media, after one brief exchange, Rowling went silent in the face of these criticisms, and refused to answer any questions or criticism from Native American fans or media.

== Move to WizardingWorld.com (2019–2024) ==
A new website, WizardingWorld.com, opened in 2019. It eventually took over Pottermore, hosting much of the news and original writing content previously available on the Pottermore website. Pottermore now redirects to the Wizarding World website.

In spring 2024, Pottermore Publishing and Audible announced a new upcoming full-cast audio book series that would feature over 100 voice actors to be released in late 2025.

== Rebranding to HarryPotter.com (2024–present) ==
In autumn 2024, the website was rebranded as "HarryPotter.com".

== See also ==
- Harry Potter fandom
- Wizarding World
