= Harry Potter cast members =

Cast members of the Harry Potter franchsise may refer to:

- Harry Potter (film series) cast members
- Harry Potter (TV series) cast members
- Wizarding World cast members

== See also ==
- List of Harry Potter characters
