= Harry Potter and the Half-Blood Prince =

2005 fantasy novel by J. K. Rowling

- Cover art of the first UK edition
- Author: J. K. Rowling
- Illustrator: Jason Cockcroft (first edition)
- Language: English
- Series: Harry Potter
- Release number: 6th in series
- Genre: Fantasy
- Publisher: Bloomsbury (UK)
- Publication date: 16 July 2005
- Publication place: United Kingdom
- Pages: 607 (first edition)
- ISBN: 0-7475-8108-8
- Dewey Decimal: 823.914
- Preceded by: Harry Potter and the Order of the Phoenix
- Followed by: Harry Potter and the Deathly Hallows

Harry Potter and the Half-Blood Prince is a fantasy novel by British author J. K. Rowling. It is the sixth and penultimate novel in the Harry Potter series, and takes place during Harry Potter's sixth year at the wizard school Hogwarts. The novel reveals events from the early life of Lord Voldemort, and chronicles Harry's preparations for the final battle against him.

The book was published in the United Kingdom by Bloomsbury and in the United States by Scholastic on 16 July 2005, as well as in several other countries. It sold almost seven million copies in the first 24 hours after its release, a record eventually broken by its sequel, Harry Potter and the Deathly Hallows. There were many controversies before and after it was published, including the right-to-read copies delivered before the release date in Canada. Reception to the novel was generally positive, and it won several awards and honours, including the 2006 British Book of the Year award. A film adaptation of the novel was released in 2009.

Reviewers noted that the book had a darker tone than its predecessors, though it did contain some humour. Some considered the main themes love, death, trust, and redemption. The considerable character development of Harry and many other teenage characters also drew attention.

== Plot ==
Narcissa Malfoy convinces Hogwarts professor Severus Snape to make an Unbreakable Vow to protect her son, Draco, while Draco carries out a mission for Lord Voldemort at the school. Meanwhile, Harry Potter is escorted by Hogwarts headmaster Albus Dumbledore to spend the summer with the Weasley family. On the way, they stop to persuade former Hogwarts professor Horace Slughorn to return to the school to teach Potions. While shopping for school supplies, Harry, Ron Weasley, and Hermione Granger see Draco making enquiries at a shop associated with the Dark Arts. Harry later overhears Draco claiming that he has become a Death Eater.

At Hogwarts, Harry excels at Potions after discovering an old textbook filled with annotations written by the "Half-Blood Prince"; Harry wins a vial of the luck potion Felix Felicis in a class competition. He learns about Voldemort's past by viewing memories in a Pensieve with Dumbledore. Voldemort grew up in a Muggle orphanage, where he used his powers to harm other children. In his later years at Hogwarts, Voldemort questioned Slughorn about a Dark magical object called a Horcrux, which grants immortality. Dumbledore asks Harry to retrieve a memory from Slughorn, as the memory he showed Harry had been altered.

Meanwhile, Gryffindor student Katie Bell is nearly killed. Harry suspects Draco is responsible but lacks proof. He continues trying to expose Draco while fulfilling his duties as captain of the Gryffindor Quidditch team. He also realises that he has feelings for Ron's sister, Ginny. Ron feels excluded from his friend group because he is the only one not invited to an exclusive club run by Slughorn. Hermione invites Ron to the club's Christmas party, but he argues with her after learning about her past relationship with Viktor Krum. Afterwards, Ron begins to perform poorly in Quidditch matches.

Harry tries to repair Ron and Hermione's relationship and restore Ron's confidence, but he fails. Ron begins dating Lavender Brown to spite Hermione, prompting Hermione to lash out at him. At Slughorn's party, Harry overhears Draco refusing Snape's offer to help him with his mission. Harry informs Hermione, Arthur Weasley, and Remus Lupin, but they believe Snape was spying for Dumbledore. Ron and Hermione reconcile after Ron almost dies by poisoning. After multiple failed attempts to obtain the memory, Harry uses Felix Felicis to successfully persuade Slughorn to relinquish it.

The memory reveals that Slughorn told Voldemort how to create a Horcrux: by committing murder, a wizard can split their soul into parts which can be placed in enchanted objects. Dumbledore believes that Voldemort has split his soul into seven parts, each of which is contained in a Horcrux. Dumbledore deduces that two Horcruxes have already been destroyed, but four are still hidden. Meanwhile, Harry begins dating Ginny and duels Draco, severely injuring him with spells taken from the Potions textbook. Harry learns that Snape informed Voldemort of the prophecy concerning him, which led to the murder of Harry's parents. When confronted, Dumbledore defends Snape and claims that Snape regretted his actions.

Dumbledore and Harry encounter several obstacles while retrieving a Horcrux from a remote cave. Back at Hogwarts, a weakened Dumbledore is ambushed by Death Eaters, who have infiltrated the castle with Draco's help. Dumbledore immobilises Harry beneath the invisibility cloak, before Draco disarms Dumbledore. Harry then watches as Snape arrives and kills Dumbledore. The Death Eaters escape and Harry gives chase and subdues several of them, but is ultimately defeated by Snape. Before escaping with Draco, Snape also reveals that he is the Half-Blood Prince to Harry.

Harry learns that the Horcrux he retrieved with Dumbledore is a fake. At Dumbledore's funeral, Harry ends his relationship with Ginny to protect her and decides to find and destroy the Horcruxes with Ron and Hermione.

== Development ==
=== Series ===
Harry Potter and the Half-Blood Prince is the sixth novel in the Harry Potter series. The first novel, Harry Potter and the Philosopher's Stone, was originally published by Bloomsbury in 1997. Philosopher's Stone was followed by Chamber of Secrets (1998), Prisoner of Azkaban (1999), Goblet of Fire (2000), and Order of the Phoenix (2003). (Note: Attributed to multiple references:) Half-Blood Prince was followed by the final novel in the series, Harry Potter and the Deathly Hallows. Half-Blood Prince sold 9 million copies in the first 24 hours of its worldwide release. (Note: Attributed to multiple references:)

=== Background ===
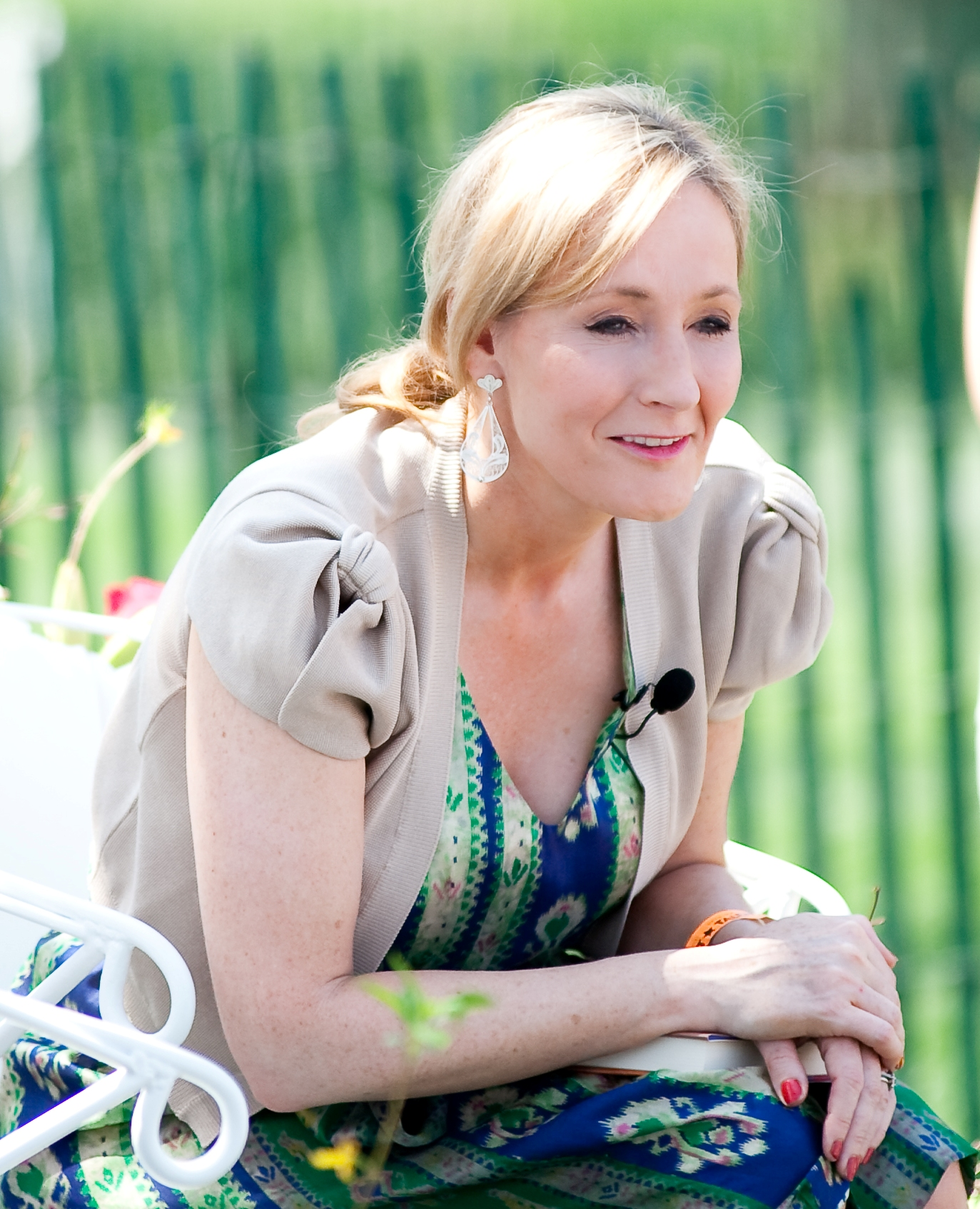
Rowling spent years planning Half-Blood Prince.

J. K. Rowling stated that she had Harry Potter and the Half-Blood Prince "planned for years," but she spent two months revisiting her plan before she began writing the story's first draft. This was a lesson learned after she did not check the plan for Goblet of Fire and had to rewrite an entire third of the book. She started writing the book before her second child David was born, but she took a break to care for him. The first chapter, "The Other Minister", which features meetings between the Muggle Prime Minister, Minister for Magic Cornelius Fudge and his successor Rufus Scrimgeour was a concept Rowling tried to start in Philosopher's Stone, Prisoner of Azkaban and Order of the Phoenix, but she found "it finally works" in Half-Blood Prince. She stated that she was "seriously upset" writing the end of the book, although Goblet of Fire was the hardest to write. When asked if she liked the book, she responded, "I like it better than I liked Goblet, Phoenix or Chamber when I finished them. Book six does what I wanted it to do and even if nobody else likes it (and some won't), I know it will remain one of my favourites of the series. Ultimately you have to please yourself before you please anyone else!"

Rowling revealed the title of Half-Blood Prince on her website on 24 June 2004. This was the title she had once considered for the second book, Chamber of Secrets, though she decided the information disclosed belonged later on in the story. On 21 December 2004, she announced she had finished writing it, along with the release date of 16 July. Bloomsbury unveiled the cover on 8 March 2005.

== Controversies ==
The record-breaking publication of Half-Blood Prince was accompanied by controversy. In May 2005, bookmakers in the UK suspended bets on which main character would die in the book amid fears of insider knowledge. A number of high-value bets were made on the death of Albus Dumbledore, many coming from the town of Bungay where it was believed the books were being printed at the time. Betting was later reopened. Additionally, in response to Greenpeace's campaign on using forest-friendly paper for big-name authors, Bloomsbury published the book on 30% recycled paper.

=== Right-to-read controversy ===
In early July 2005, a Real Canadian Superstore in Coquitlam, British Columbia, Canada, accidentally sold fourteen copies of The Half-Blood Prince before the authorised release date. The Canadian publisher, Raincoast Books, obtained an injunction from the Supreme Court of British Columbia that prohibited the purchasers from reading the books before the official release date or discussing the contents. Purchasers were offered Harry Potter T-shirts and autographed copies of the book if they returned their copies before 16 July.

On 15 July, less than twelve hours before the book went on sale in the Eastern time zone, Raincoast warned The Globe and Mail newspaper that publishing a review from a Canada-based writer at midnight, as the paper had promised, would be seen as a violation of the trade secret injunction. The injunction sparked a number of news articles alleging that the injunction had restricted fundamental rights. Canadian law professor Michael Geist posted commentary on his blog. Richard Stallman called for a boycott and requested the publisher issue an apology. The Globe and Mail published a review from two UK-based writers in its 16 July edition and posted the Canadian writer's review on its website at 9:00 that morning. Commentary was also provided on the Raincoast website.

== Style and themes ==
Some reviewers noted that Half-Blood Prince contained a darker tone than the previous Potter novels. The Christian Science Monitor's reviewer Yvonne Zipp argued the first half contained a lighter tone to soften the unhappy ending. The Boston Globe reviewer Liz Rosenberg wrote, "lightness [is] slimmer than ever in this darkening series...[there is] a new charge of gloom and darkness. I felt depressed by the time I was two-thirds of the way through." She also compared the setting to Charles Dickens's depictions of London as it was "brooding, broken, gold-lit, as living a character as any other." Christopher Paolini called the darker tone "disquieting" because it was so different from the earlier books. Liesl Schillinger, a contributor to The New York Times book review, also noted that Half-Blood Prince was "far darker" but "leavened with humor, romance and snappy dialogue." She suggested a connection to the 11 September attacks, as the later, darker novels were written after that event. David Kipen, a critic of the San Francisco Chronicle, considered the "darkness as a sign of our paranoid times" and singled out curfews and searches that were part of the tightened security at Hogwarts as resemblances to our world.

Julia Keller, a critic for the Chicago Tribune, highlighted the humour found in the novel and claimed it to be the success of the Harry Potter saga. She acknowledged that "the books are dark and scary in places" but "no darkness in Half-Blood Prince...is so immense that it cannot be rescued by a snicker or a smirk." She considered that Rowling was suggesting difficult times can be worked through with imagination, hope, and humour and compared this concept to works such as Madeleine L'Engle's A Wrinkle in Time and Kenneth Grahame's The Wind in the Willows.

Rosenberg wrote that the two main themes of Half-Blood Prince were love and death and praised Rowling's "affirmation of their central position in human lives." She considered love to be represented in several forms: the love of parent to child, teacher to student, and the romances that developed between the main characters. Zipp noted trust and redemption to be themes promising to continue in the final book, which she thought "would add a greater layer of nuance and complexity to some characters who could sorely use it." Deepti Hajela also pointed out Harry's character development, that he was "no longer a boy wizard; he's a young man, determined to seek out and face a young man's challenges." Paolini had similar views, claiming, "the children have changed...they act like real teenagers."

== Publication and reception ==
=== Critical reception ===
According to BBC News Online, Harry Potter and the Half-Blood Prince received mixed reviews from literary critics upon its release. Liesl Schillinger of The New York Times praised the novel's various themes and suspenseful ending. However, she considered Rowling's gift "not so much for language as for characterisation and plotting." Kirkus Reviews said it "will leave readers pleased, amused, excited, scared, infuriated, delighted, sad, surprised, thoughtful and likely wondering where Voldemort has got to, since he appears only in flashbacks." They considered Rowling's "wry wit" to turn into "outright merriment" but called the climax "tragic, but not uncomfortably shocking." Yvonne Zipp of The Christian Science Monitor praised the way Rowling evolved Harry into a teenager and how the plot threads found as far back as Chamber of Secrets came into play. On the other hand, she noted it "gets a little exposition-heavy in spots," and older readers may have seen the ending coming.

The Boston Globe correspondent Liz Rosenberg wrote, "The book bears the mark of genius on every page" and praised the imagery and darker tone of the book, considering that the series could be crossing over from fantasy to horror. The Associated Press writer Deepti Hajela praised the newfound emotional tones and ageing Harry to the point at which "younger fans may find [the series] has grown up too much." Emily Green, a staff writer for the Los Angeles Times, was generally positive about the book but was concerned whether young children could handle the material. Cultural critic Julia Keller of the Chicago Tribune called it the "most eloquent and substantial addition to the series thus far" and considered the key to the success of the Potter novels to be humour.

=== Awards and honours ===
Harry Potter and the Half-Blood Prince won several awards, including the 2006 British Book of the Year Award and the 2006 Royal Mail Award for Scottish Children's Books for ages 8–12 in its native United Kingdom. In the United States, the American Library Association listed it among its 2006 Best Books for Young Adults. It won both the 2005 reader-voted Quill Awards for Best Book of the Year and Best Children's Book. It also won the Oppenheim Toy Portfolio Platinum Seal for notable book.

=== Sales ===
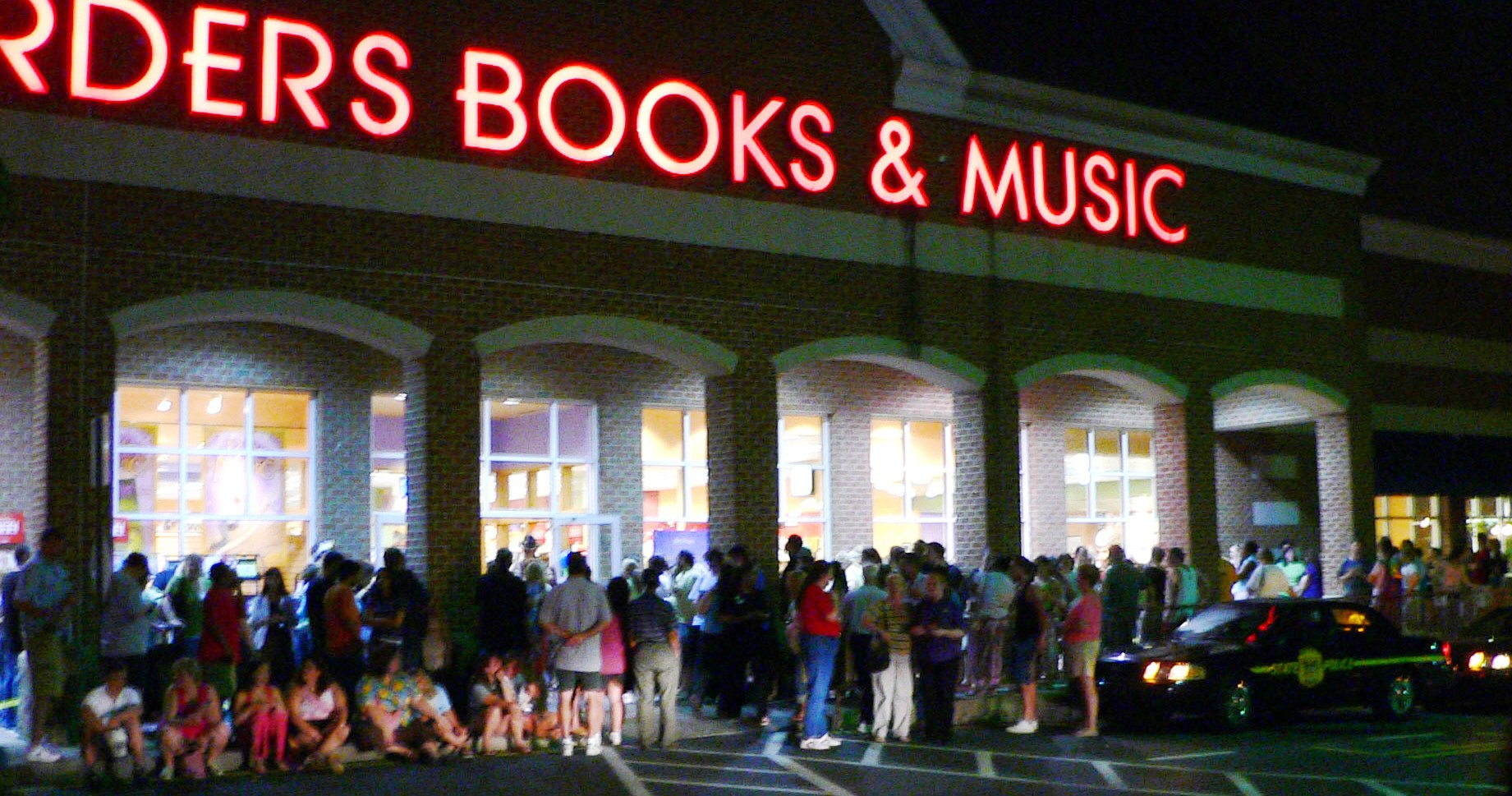
Fans wait outside a Borders in Newark, Delaware for the midnight release of the book.

Before publication, 1.4 million pre-orders were placed for Half-Blood Prince on Amazon.com, breaking the record held by the previous novel, Order of the Phoenix, with 1.3 million. The initial print run for Half-Blood Prince was a record-breaking 10.8 million. Within the first 24 hours after release, the book sold 9 million copies worldwide: 2 million in the UK and about 6.9 million in the US, which prompted Scholastic to rush an additional 2.7 million copies into print. Within the first nine weeks of publication, 11 million copies of the US edition were reported to have been sold. The US audiobook, read by Jim Dale, set sales records with 165,000 sold over two days, besting the adaptation of Order of the Phoenix by twenty percent.

== Translations ==
Harry Potter and the Half-Blood Prince was published simultaneously in the UK, US, Canada, Australia, New Zealand, and South Africa. Along with the rest of the books in the Harry Potter series, it was eventually translated into 67 languages. However, because of high security surrounding the manuscript, translators did not get to start on translating Half-Blood Prince until its English release date, and the earliest were not expected to be released until the fall of 2005. In Germany, a group of "hobby translators" translated the book via the internet less than two days after release, long before German translator Klaus Fritz could translate and publish the book.

== Editions ==
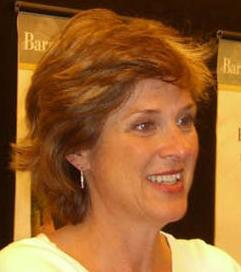
Reproductions of artwork by Mary GrandPré (pictured) were available with the Scholastic Deluxe Edition.

Since its wide hardcover release on 16 July 2005, Half-Blood Prince was released as a paperback on 23 June 2006 in the UK. Two days later on 25 July, the paperback edition was released in Canada and the US, where it had an initial print run of 2 million copies. To celebrate the release of the American paperback edition, Scholastic held a six-week sweepstakes event in which participants in an online poll were entered to win prizes. Simultaneous to the original hardcover release was the UK adult edition that featured a new cover and was also released as a paperback on 23 June. Also released on 16 July was the Scholastic "Deluxe Edition," which featured reproductions of Mary GrandPré's artwork and had a print run of about 100,000 copies. Bloomsbury later released a paperback "Special Edition" on 6 July 2009 and a "Signature Edition" paperback on 1 November 2010.

== Adaptations ==
=== Film ===
The film adaptation of the sixth book was originally scheduled to be released on 21 November 2008 but was changed to 15 July 2009. Directed by David Yates, the screenplay was adapted by Steve Kloves and produced by David Heyman and David Barron. The film grossed over $934 million worldwide, which made it the second-highest-grossing film of 2009 worldwide and the fifteenth-highest of all time. Additionally, Half-Blood Prince gained an Academy Award nomination for Best Cinematography.

=== Video games ===
A video game adaptation of the book was developed by EA Bright Light Studio and published by Electronic Arts in 2009. The game was available on Windows, Nintendo DS, PlayStation 2, PlayStation 3, PlayStation Portable, Wii, Xbox 360, and macOS platforms.

The book was also adapted in the 2011 video game Lego Harry Potter: Years 5–7.
