= Hogwarts =

Fictional school in Harry Potter

Hogwarts School of Witchcraft and Wizardry
- Harry Potter organization
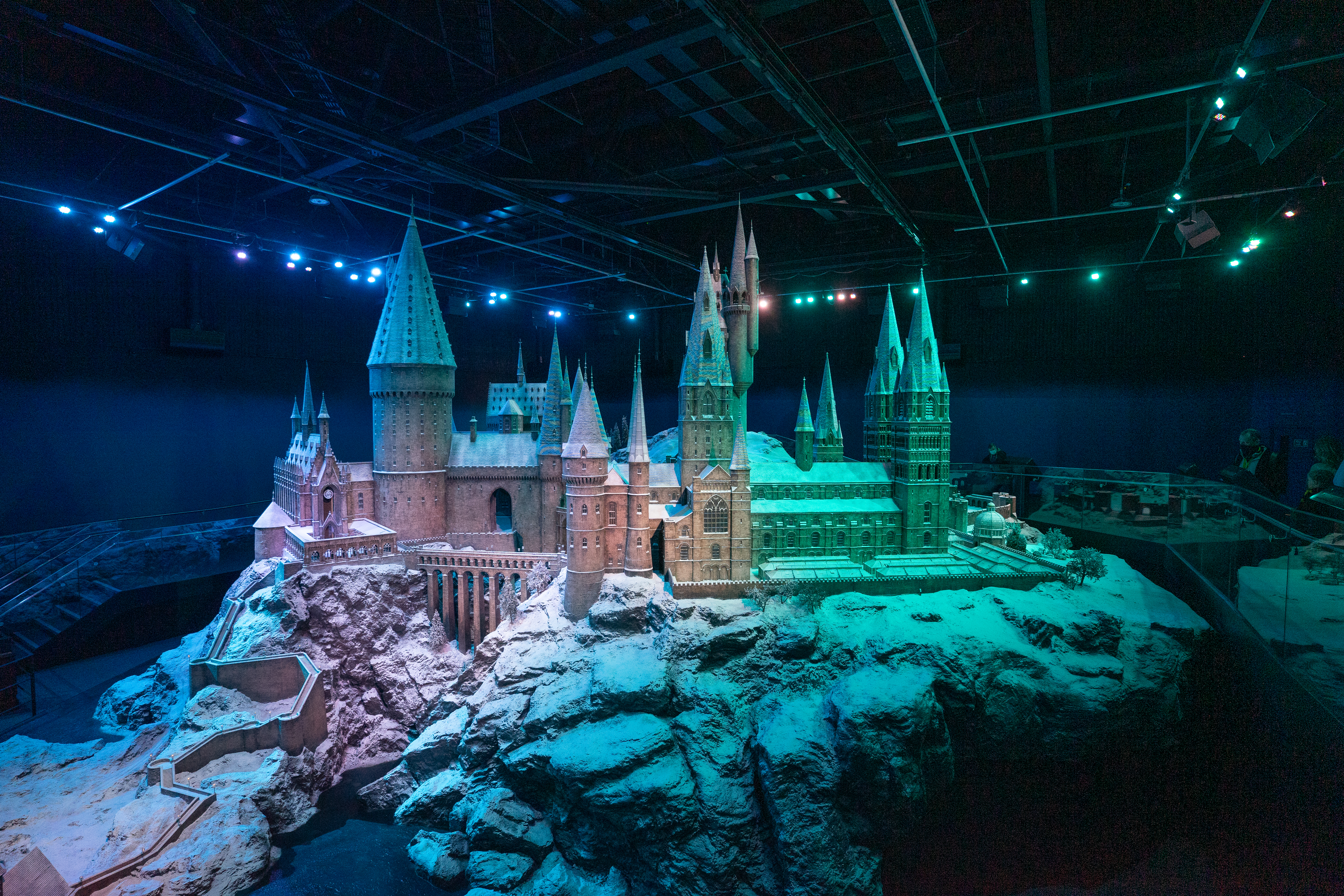
- A model of Hogwarts at Warner Bros. Studio Tour London – The Making of Harry Potter
- First appearance: Harry Potter and the Philosopher's Stone (1997)

In-universe information
- Type: Secondary school; Boarding school
- Founded: c. 9th/10th century
- Location: Scotland
- Owner: Ministry of Magic
- Motto: Draco dormiens nunquam titillandus (Note: The motto translates from Latin as "Never Tickle a Sleeping Dragon".)

Hogwarts School of Witchcraft and Wizardry (/ˈhɒɡwɔːrts/) is a fictional boarding school of magic in the Harry Potter series by J. K. Rowling. It is the primary setting for the first six novels and films and also serves as a major setting in the larger Wizarding World media franchise.

In the novels, Hogwarts is described as a coeducational, secondary boarding school that enrolls children from ages eleven to eighteen. According to Rowling, any child in Britain who shows magical ability is invited to attend the school. The Wizarding World website states that Hogwarts was founded in the Highlands of Scotland sometime between the 9th and 10th century by the wizards Godric Gryffindor, Helga Hufflepuff, Rowena Ravenclaw and Salazar Slytherin. Rowling has offered varying accounts of how many students are enrolled at Hogwarts at any given time.

In a 1999 interview, Rowling said she envisioned Hogwarts as a place that offers security to the orphaned Harry Potter. She said that she made Hogwarts a boarding school because many important plot events occur at night. Several writers have suggested that Rowling took the name "Hogwarts" from the 1954 book How to Be Topp by Geoffrey Willans; the book describes a fictional play titled "The Hogwarts" and a fictional school headmaster named "Hoggwart". Rowling, however, said she may have unknowingly derived the name "Hogwarts" from the name of the hogwort plant.

The word "hogwarts" also appears once in the 1939 novel Finnegans Wake by James Joyce.

== Castle and grounds ==
Rowling has described Hogwarts as a "huge, rambling, quite scary-looking castle, with a jumble of towers and battlements". She said the castle is supported by magic. The school grounds have sloping lawns, vegetable gardens and greenhouses. There is a pitch for playing the wizard sport Quidditch, and a large wooded area known as the Forbidden Forest. There is also a lake, which is home to merpeople, grindylows and a giant squid. Wizards cannot apparate (teleport) on Hogwarts grounds, but there are several hidden passages that lead into and out of the school. In Harry Potter and the Goblet of Fire (2000), it is explained that Muggles (non-magical people) cannot see Hogwarts because there are numerous enchantments on it.

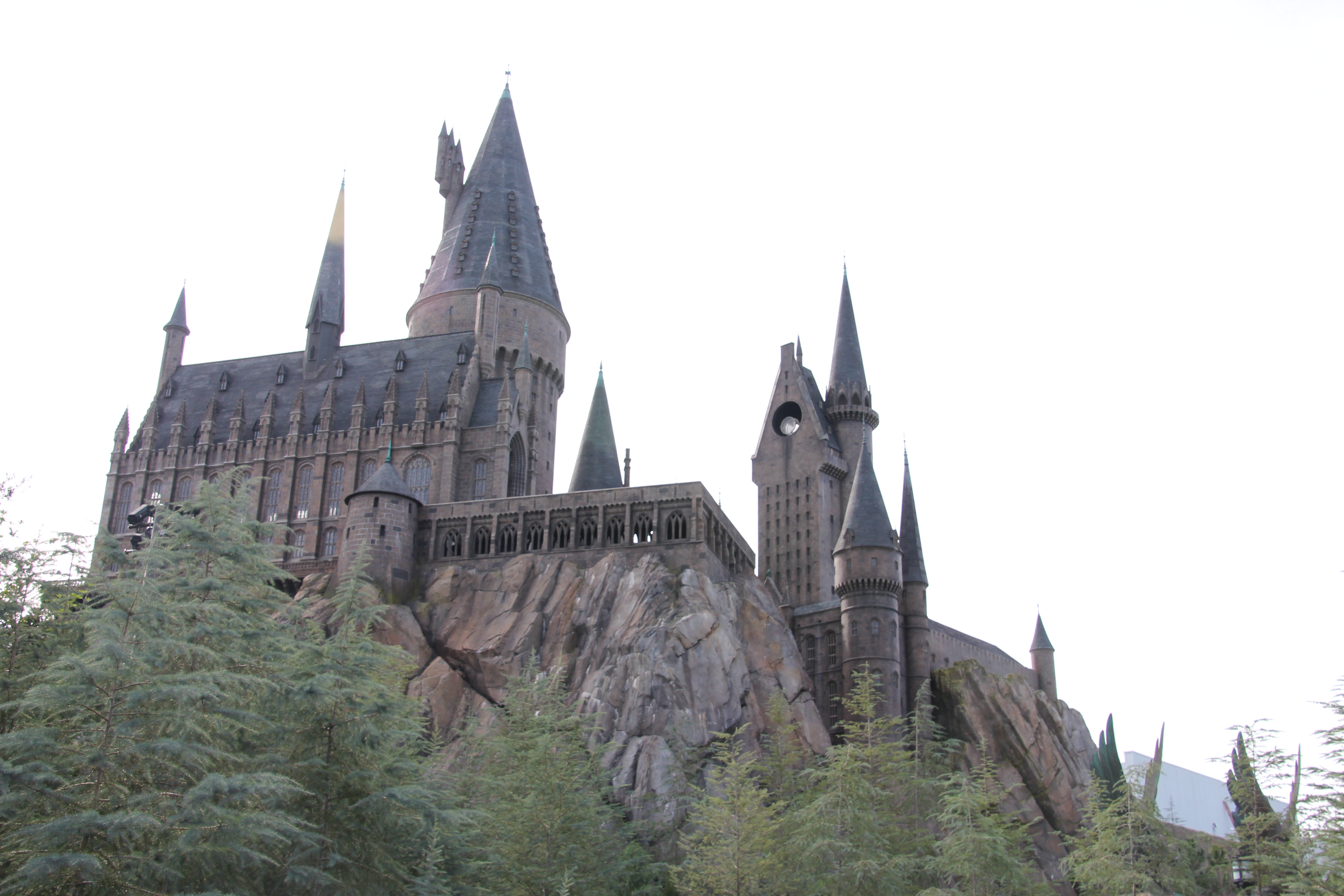
A version of Hogwarts castle at Universal Islands of Adventure amusement park in Orlando, Florida

A subterranean area of the castle known as the Chamber of Secrets is introduced in the second novel, Harry Potter and the Chamber of Secrets (1998). In the novel, the young student Ginny Weasley is forced to open the Chamber by the Dark wizard Voldemort. From the Chamber emerges a deadly Basilisk, which attacks students until Harry kills it. A magical room called the Room of Requirement is also located in Hogwarts. It only appears when someone needs it, and contains whatever the person requires. In Order of the Phoenix (2003), Harry holds meetings of his student group Dumbledore's Army in the Room of Requirement. In Harry Potter and the Half-Blood Prince (2005), Draco Malfoy uses the room to hide and repair a Vanishing Cabinet, which allows him to smuggle Voldemort's Death Eaters into Hogwarts.

== Houses ==
Clockwise from top left, an artist's rendering of the coats of arms of the houses: Gryffindor, Hufflepuff, Slytherin and Ravenclaw

When a first-year student arrives at Hogwarts, the magical Sorting Hat is placed on their head. It examines their mind and assigns them to a House based on their abilities, personality, and preferences. Hogwarts has four Houses, each named after one of the founders of the school. Throughout the school year, the Houses compete for the House Cup, gaining and losing points based on actions such as performance in class and rule violations. The House with the most points at the end of the year wins the House Cup and has its colours displayed in the Great Hall during the following school year. Each House also has its own Quidditch team that competes for the Quidditch Cup. Each House is under the authority of one of the Hogwarts professors. The four Houses are described below.

- Gryffindor values courage, nerve, and chivalry. Gryffindor's mascot is a lion, their colours are red and gold, and the Head of House is Minerva McGonagall. The Gryffindor dormitories are in a high tower, and students must use a password to gain entry. According to Rowling, Gryffindor corresponds roughly to the element of fire.
- Hufflepuff values hard work, patience, justice, and loyalty. Hufflepuff's mascot is a badger, their colours are yellow and black, and the Head of House is Pomona Sprout. Their dormitories are located underneath the kitchens of the Great Hall, being accessible by completing a rhythmic password on its barrel-shaped entrance. Rowling said that Hufflepuff corresponds roughly to the element of earth.
- Ravenclaw values intelligence, learning, wisdom, and wit. The house mascot is an eagle in the novels, and a raven in the Harry Potter and Fantastic Beasts films, and their colours are blue and bronze. In the novels, the Head of Ravenclaw House is Filius Flitwick. The dormitories are in Ravenclaw Tower, and students must solve a riddle to gain entry. Ravenclaw corresponds roughly to the element of air.
- Slytherin values ambition, cunning, leadership, and resourcefulness. The mascot of Slytherin is a serpent and their colours are green and silver. Severus Snape is the Head of Slytherin House until he becomes headmaster, at which point Horace Slughorn assumes the position. The Slytherin dormitories are accessed by speaking a password in front of a stone wall in the dungeons, which causes a hidden door to open. Slytherin corresponds roughly to the element of water.

Each year, two fifth-year students from each House are selected as prefects. The position grants them certain privileges and the authority to give detentions for infractions. The leaders of the student body, the head girl and head boy, are chosen from among the seventh-year students. Hogwarts students in their third year or higher are allowed to visit the nearby wizarding village of Hogsmeade.

== Hogwarts Express ==
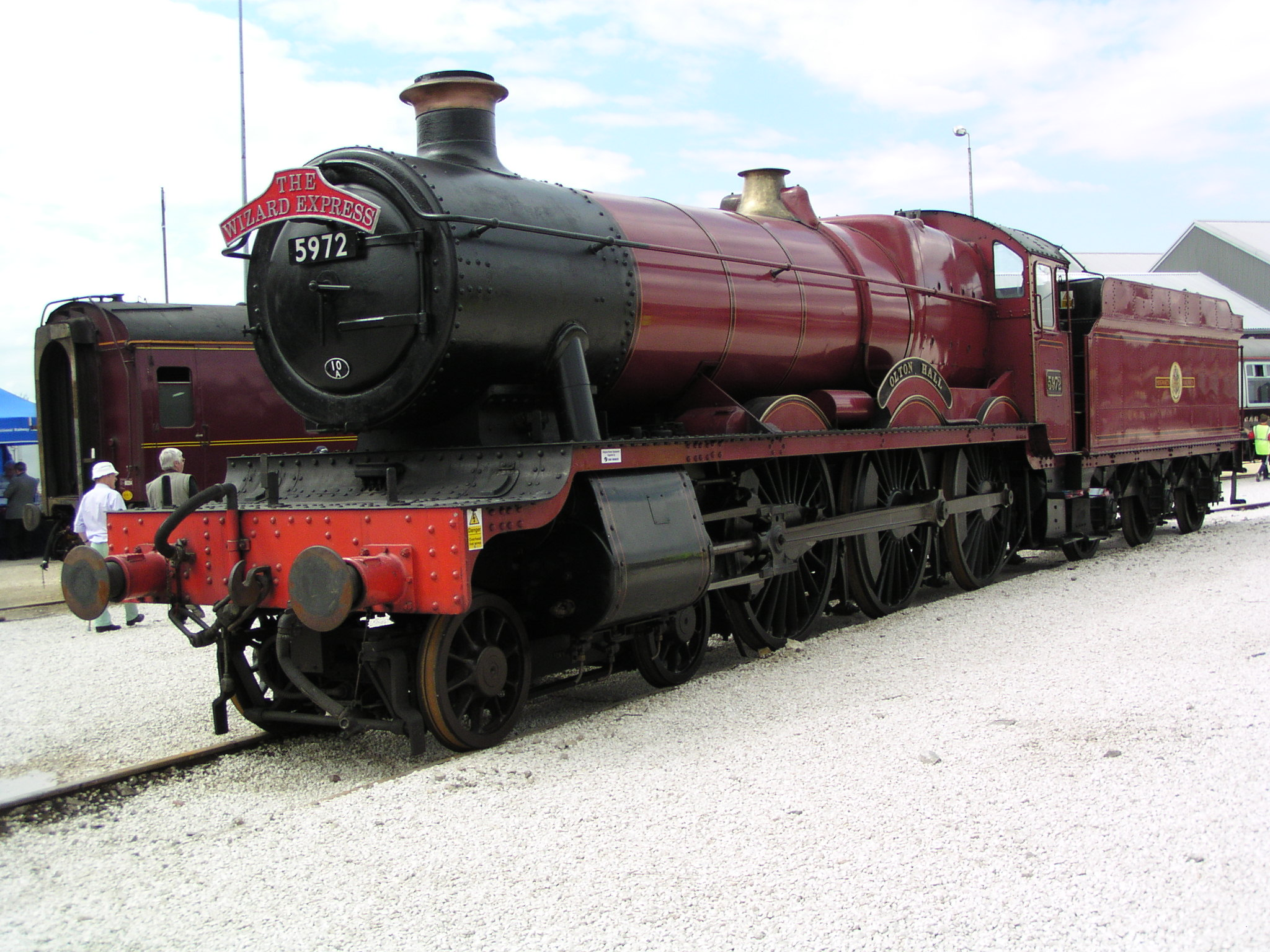
The 5972 Olton Hall steam engine was used as the Hogwarts Express in the Harry Potter films.

The Hogwarts Express is described as an express train pulled by a steam engine that transports students to and from Hogwarts. At the beginning of each school year, the train departs from the fictional Platform 9¾ at London's King's Cross station and delivers students to Hogsmeade Station. A functioning full-scale replica of the Hogwarts Express was created for The Wizarding World of Harry Potter themed area at Universal Orlando Resort. The train transports visitors from a life-size replica of Hogsmeade Village to a replica of Diagon Alley.

== In film ==
Hogwarts is featured in the Harry Potter film adaptations. England's Alnwick Castle was used for many scenes depicting exterior parts of the school. Shots of the entire school were created by adding a digital spire to images of Durham Cathedral, which also served as a set for the interior of Hogwarts. A detailed scale model of Hogwarts was also used during production of the films.

== Cultural impact ==
In 2008, the Independent Schools Network Rankings website featured Hogwarts on a list of the best schools in Scotland. Frank Tiarks, the managing director of the website, said Hogwarts was included on the list for fun. It was ranked as the 36th-best school, surpassing Edinburgh's Loretto School.

== See also ==
- List of Harry Potter characters
- Fictional universe of Harry Potter
- Places in Harry Potter
- Warner Bros. Studio Tour London: The Making of Harry Potter
