= Religious debates over the Harry Potter series =

Debates based on claims that the Harry Potter novels contain occult or satanic subtexts

Religious debates over the Harry Potter series of books by J. K. Rowling are based on claims that the novels contain occult or Satanic subtexts. A number of Protestant, Catholic, and Eastern Orthodox Christians have argued against the series, as have some Muslims. Supporters of the series have said that the magic in Harry Potter bears little resemblance to occultism, being more in the vein of fairytales such as Cinderella and Snow White, or to the works of C. S. Lewis and J. R. R. Tolkien, both of whom are known for writing fantasy novels with Christian subtexts. Far from promoting a particular religion, some argue, the Harry Potter novels go out of their way to avoid discussing religion at all. However, the author of the series, J. K. Rowling, identifies as a Christian, and many have noted the Christian references which she includes in the final novel Harry Potter and the Deathly Hallows.

In the United States, calls for the books to be banned from schools have led to legal challenges, often on the grounds that witchcraft is a government-recognised religion and that to allow the books to be held in public schools violates the separation of church and state. The Bulgarian Orthodox Church and a diocese of the Orthodox Church of Greece also campaigned against the series.

Religious responses to Harry Potter have not all been negative. "At least as much as they've been attacked from a theological point of view," notes Rowling, "[the books] have been lauded and taken into pulpit, and most interesting and satisfying for me, it's been by several different faiths."

== Christianity ==
Denouncement has taken two main forms: allegations that Harry Potter is a pagan text; and claims that it encourages children to oppose authority, derived mainly from Harry's rejection of the Dursleys, his aunt and uncle. Author and scholar Amanda Cockrell suggests that Harry Potter's popularity, and recent preoccupation with fantasy and the occult among Christian fundamentalists, explains why the series received particular opposition.

The Harry Potter books also have a group of vocal religious supporters who believe that Harry Potter espouses Christian values or that the Bible does not prohibit the forms of magic described in the series. Christian analyses of the series have argued that it embraces ideals of friendship, loyalty, courage, love, and the temptation of power. After the final volume was published, Rowling said she intentionally incorporated Christian themes, in particular the idea that love may hold power over death. According to Joy Farmer, it is a "profound misreading to think that Harry Potter promotes witchcraft". Scholar Em McAvan writes that evangelical objections to Harry Potter are superficial, based on the presence of magic in the books: they do not attempt to understand the moral messages in the series.

=== Evangelicalism ===
Much of the condemnation of Harry Potter comes from a small number of evangelical Christians who hold that the series's depiction of witchcraft is dangerous to children. In 1999, Paul Hetrick, spokesperson for Focus on the Family, a US Evangelical Christian group based in Colorado Springs, Colorado, outlined the reasons for his opposition: "[They contain] some powerful and valuable lessons about love and courage and the ultimate victory of good over evil; however, the positive messages are packaged in a medium—witchcraft—that is directly denounced in Scripture." Harry Potter has been the subject of at least six book burnings in the US. In 2002, Chick Publications produced a comic book tract titled "The Nervous Witch" that declared "the Potter books open a doorway that will put untold millions of kids into hell". The 2006 documentary film, Jesus Camp, infamously featured a scene in which youth pastor, Becky Fischer, ranted, “And while I'm on the subject, let me say something about Harry Potter. Warlocks are the enemies of God! And I don't care what kind of hero they are, they're an enemy of God and had it been in the Old Testament, Harry Potter would have been put to death! You don’t make heroes out of warlocks!” In 2007, Jacqui Komschlies wrote an article in Christianity Today comparing Harry Potter to "rat poison mixed with orange soda" and saying "We're taking something deadly from our world and turning it into what some are calling 'merely a literary device.'"

Some Christians have suggested that Harry Potter promotes the religion of Wicca, and so keeping the books in public schools violates the separation of church and state in the US. Jeremiah Films, a Christian video company largely known for its The Clinton Chronicles release, also released a DVD entitled Harry Potter: Witchcraft Repackaged, which stated that "Harry's world says that drinking dead animal blood gives power, a satanic human sacrifice and Harry's powerful blood brings new life, demon possession is not spiritually dangerous, and that passing through fire, contacting the dead, and conversing with ghosts, others in the spirit world, and more, is normal and acceptable."

In 2001, Evangelical journalist Richard Abanes, who has written several books arguing against new religions and Mormonism, published a polemical text that made similar allegations to the video: Harry Potter and the Bible: The Menace Behind the Magick. Later editions incorporated comparisons and contrasts between Harry Potter and the more overtly Christian works of C.S. Lewis and J.R.R. Tolkien. In an interview with the Christian Broadcasting Network, Abanes remarked that, "One of the easiest ways to know whether a fantasy book or film has real world magick in it is to just ask a simple question, 'Can my child find information in a library or bookstore that will enable them to replicate what they are seeing in the film or the book?' If you go to The Chronicles of Narnia and The Lord of the Rings what you see in, story magic and imagination, it is not real. You can't replicate it. But if you go to something like Harry Potter, you can find references to astrology, clairvoyance, and numerology. It takes seconds to go into a bookstore or library and get books on that and start investigating it, researching it, and doing it." Abanes wrote: "The classic passage dealing with divination, along with several other forms of occultism, is Deuteronomy 18:10–12:

There shall not be found among you any one that maketh his son or his daughter pass through the fire, or that useth divination, or an observer of times, or an enchanter, or a witch, or a charmer, or a consulter with familiar spirits, or a wizard, or a necromancer. For all that do these things are an abomination unto the LORD.

"If this were the only passage dealing with occultism, it would be enough to forbid all of the practices found in the Harry Potter series. But there are numerous other verses to consider".

The debate has inspired at least two satirical Internet urban legends. In 2001, The Onion, a US satirical newspaper, published an article entitled "Harry Potter Sparks Rise in Satanism Among Children", which said that the "High Priest of Satanism" had described Harry Potter as "an absolute godsend to our cause". This article was copied into a chain letter and circulated among Christians as "proof" of their views. The following year, the Canadian daily the National Post released a similar spoof article in its satirical column Post Morten, saying that "Rowling—or, as she shall henceforth be referred to and credited as, Mrs. J. K. Satan—said that as she sat in a coffee shop one grey day, wondering what to do with her empty, aimless life, it hit her, 'I'll give myself, body and soul, to the Dark Master. And in return, he will give me absurd wealth and power over the weak and pitiful of the world. And he did!'" This article was also copied into a chain letter and released as "truth" onto the web.

In 2009, Matt Latimer, a former speechwriter for US President George W. Bush, claimed that, during the Bush administration, "people in the White House" had denied Rowling the Presidential Medal of Freedom because the books "encourage witchcraft".

While some evangelical Christians consider Harry Potter related to Satanism, a poll in 2000 indicated that this position remains a minority view. Seven percent of Americans who have heard of the books have a negative view of them, with 52 percent having a positive opinion and the remaining 41 percent unsure. This compares with 33 percent of Americans who identify themselves as Evangelical and 39 percent who take the Bible literally. In 2001, the Alamogordo Christ Community Church in New Mexico burned hundreds of copies of the Harry Potter books. Jack Brock, leader of the church, said the books were an abomination because they inspired children to study the occult. He and his followers admitted they have never read any of the books and tossed in some Stephen King novels. Venezuelan scholar Fernando Baez, in a study of the history of censorship and book destruction, commented "There is more than one way to destroy a book, upon being denied a city permit to burn books, the Rev. Douglas Taylor in Lewiston, Maine, has held several annual gatherings at which he cuts the Potter books up with scissors."

Some evangelicals have supported the Potter books: evangelical author Connie Neal, in her books What's a Christian to Do with Harry Potter?, The Gospel According to Harry Potter, and Wizards, Wardrobes, and Wookiees: Navigating Good and Evil in Harry Potter, Narnia, and Star Wars, wrote that the books preach Christian values and can be used to educate children in Christian tenets. Mike Hertenstein of Cornerstone magazine, in his article "Harry Potter vs the Muggles, Myth, Magic & Joy", uses the term 'Muggles', used in the books to describe non-magical humans, to describe Christians without imagination. Christianity Today published an editorial in favour of the books in January 2000, calling the series a "Book of Virtues" and averring that, although "modern witchcraft is indeed an ensnaring, seductive false religion that we must protect our children from", this does not represent the Potter books, which have "wonderful examples of compassion, loyalty, courage, friendship, and even self-sacrifice". Italian Methodist minister Peter Ciaccio analysed the relationship between J.K. Rowling's work and Christian theology, stating that the Harry Potter series is the positive outcome of the encounter of the Judeo–Christian tradition with other important features of the Western cultural heritage (namely Celtic, Nordic, and Classical).

=== Catholicism ===
The Catholic Church has taken no official position on the books, but various Catholics, including officials of the Roman Curia, the hierarchy, and other official bodies, have presented mixed views on the subject.

==== Vatican ====
In 2003, Peter Fleetwood, a priest incardinated in the Archdiocese of Liverpool then serving as an official of the Pontifical Council for Culture, made comments supportive of the novels during a press conference announcing the release of A Christian Reflection on the New Age. In response to a question asking if the magic presented in the Harry Potter series should be considered in the same light as some New Age practices warned against in the document, Fleetwood stated "If I have understood well the intentions of Harry Potter's author, they help children to see the difference between good and evil. And she is very clear on this." He added that Rowling is "Christian by conviction, is Christian in her mode of living, even in her way of writing." This comment was seized on by the media as an endorsement of the novels from the Catholic Church and, by extension, the Pope at that time, John Paul II.

Denouncements against the books came from one of the official exorcists of the Archdiocese of Rome, Gabriele Amorth, who believed that, "Behind Harry Potter hides the signature of the king of the darkness, the devil."

Cardinal Ratzinger, the later Pope Benedict XVI, wrote in two private letters in 2003 that the books create "subtle seductions" that "deeply distort Christianity in the soul, before it can grow properly". Before the release of Harry Potter and the Half-Blood Prince in 2005, Fleetwood, then serving with the Council of the Bishops' Conferences of Europe, gave an interview with Vatican Radio. In the interview, Fleetwood reaffirmed his positive opinion of the books and remarked that then-Cardinal Ratzinger's letters may have been written by a member of the congregation's staff and simply signed by the prefect. He also stated that his and Amorth's opinions are just that, conflicting personal opinions of priests.

The Vatican newspaper, L'Osservatore Romano, dedicated a full page to the debate in its 14–15 January 2008 issue. Essayist Paolo Gulisano said the Harry Potter novels offer lessons in the importance of love and self-giving, but Professor Edoardo Rialti described Harry Potter as "the wrong kind of hero" and said that "Despite several positive values that can be found in the story, at the foundations of this tale is the proposal that of witchcraft as positive, the violent manipulation of things and people thanks to the knowledge of the occult, an advantage of a select few: the ends justify the means because the knowledgeable, the chosen ones, the intellectuals know how to control the dark powers and turn them into good [...]. This is a grave and deep lie, because it is the old Gnostic temptation of confusing salvation and truth with a secret knowledge." However, in July 2009, L'Osservatore Romano praised the moral stance of the sixth Harry Potter film, Harry Potter and the Half-Blood Prince, saying "There is a clear line of demarcation between good and evil and [the film] makes clear that good is right. One understands as well that sometimes this requires hard work and sacrifice." It also noted that the film made clear that "the search for immortality epitomised by Lord Voldemort" was morally wrong.

==== Australia ====
Beginning in 2001, Cardinal George Pell, Archbishop of Sydney, has occasionally written on the Harry Potter series in his regular column in The Sunday Telegraph. In his columns, he praised the books for displaying values that are "deeply compatible with Christianity". In his book Be Not Afraid, Pell praised the books as having a "good dose of moral truth" and for being "a good yarn".

==== Poland ====
In Poland, priests from northern city of Koszalin or Gdańsk publicly burned books and other objects they believe promote magic and sorcery, such as several copies of such books as Harry Potter, Twilight, and one about the controversial guru Rajneesh, as well as African tribal masks on 1 April 2019. As a justification, they quoted following biblical passages: A passage from Acts of the Apostles, quoted in by the group, said "many of those who had practiced magic collected their books and burned them in front of everyone. So they calculated their value and found it to be fifty thousand pieces of silver". Another passage, from Book of Deuteronomy, said: "Burn the images of their gods. Don't desire the silver or the gold that is on them and take it for yourself, or you will be trapped by it. That is detestable to the Lord your God."

==== United States ====
For the film adaptations, the Office for Film and Broadcasting of the US Conference of Catholic Bishops has rated each film either "A-II" or "A-III", meaning the content was not found to be morally offensive. The episcopal conference named the film adaptation of Harry Potter and the Prisoner of Azkaban as one of the 10 best family films of 2004 and Harry Potter and the Deathly Hallows – Part 1 as one of the best movies of 2010.

In August 2019, after consulting with exorcists in both the US and Rome, Dan Reehil, a pastor at the Roman Catholic parish school of St Edward in Nashville, Tennessee, banned the books from the school library on the grounds that "The curses and spells used in the books are actual curses and spells; which when read by a human being risk conjuring evil spirits into the presence of the person reading the text".

=== Eastern Orthodox ===
In 2002, the Metropolis of Didymoteicho (Greece) authorities released a statement denouncing the Harry Potter books as Satanic, saying that they "acquaint people with evil, wizardry, the occult and demonology". The statement also criticised the purported similarities between Harry Potter and Jesus Christ, saying: "It is beyond doubt that Harry was made to resemble a young savior. Upon his birth people try to kill him, he is forever subjected to injustice but always supernaturally manages to prevail and save others. Let us reflect, who else [...] is held to be the unjustly treated God?"

In June 2004, soon after a native Bulgarian, Stanislav Ianevski, had been cast to portray the character Viktor Krum in the film adaptation of Harry Potter and the Goblet of Fire, the Bulgarian Orthodox Church printed a front-page interview with bishop Gabriel Dinev in their official newspaper, claiming that "magic is not a children's game" and that the Holy Synod had advised that people go every Thursday to a church in Sofia where special services are held to help those said to be afflicted by spells and curses or possessed by evil spirits. Pamphlets were posted throughout the city, claiming that reciting a Harry Potter spell "is as if you are praying to evil" and that "God hates magic."

A heated discussion about the Harry Potter books has broken out in the Russian Orthodox Church (ROC). Among the most famous opponents of the presence of Harry Potter books in the library of the Orthodox family are the following famous Russian Orthodox priests and laypeople: Archpriest Andrey Tkachov, confessor of the Orthodox youth of Moscow; Archpriest Dimitry Smirnov, head of the Patriarchal Commission for the Protection of the Family, Motherhood and Childhood; publicists Irina Medvedeva and Tatyana Shishova; and professor of the Moscow Theological Academy Alexei Osipov. Initially, the opponents of Harry Potter prevailed in the ROC. Among the supporters of the work among the ROC clergy, Protodeacon Andrey Kuraev, Hieromonk Demetrius (Pershin), Archpriest Andrei Posternak, priest Alexy Pluzhnikov, and religious scholar Roman Silantyev can be singled out. Initially, attempts to find something good in the Harry Potter series of books caused outrage among the opponents. But, later, the situation changed. According to modern (2020) scholars, "the longer the time interval separates us from the release date of the last book, the fewer critical statements appear in the information field". They also give examples of the use of allusions to the Harry Potter universe in a positive context by students of educational institutions of the ROC. On 29 July 2021, Vladimir R. Legoyda, chair of the Synodal Department for Relations with Society and the Media of the Moscow Patriarchate, noted that it was wrong to denounce J.K. Rowling's books "in some kind of magism and devilry". He stressed that, if you approach Harry Potter from this position, then similar moments can be seen in Russian folktales. Legoyda stressed that based on Rowling's interview, she unconsciously drew evangelical parallels and put Christian meanings in a series of books about the Boy Who Lived"

=== Church of England ===
In 2000, the Dean of Canterbury Cathedral refused to allow his church to be filmed as part of Hogwarts in the Harry Potter film series, saying that it was unfitting for a Christian church to be used to promote pagan imagery. Gloucester Cathedral agreed to take its place; the Dean of Gloucester, the Very Reverend Nicholas Bury, admitted to being a fan of the books: "I think the book is a marvellous traditional children's story and excellently written. It is also amusing, exciting and wholesome, and is just the sort of story families should be encouraged to read." The decision still resulted in many angry letters to the local paper, the Gloucester Citizen. Said one honorary chaplain: "Oh yes, there was quite a to-do. There was one particular man, very evangelical, writing in and complaining that it wasn't right for such things to be going on. I don't think it was so much the film's subject matter but the fact that filming was happening at all." Similarly, Durham Cathedral also allowed its use for two of the films.

Then-Archbishop of Canterbury George Carey gave positive remarks about the Harry Potter and the Philosopher's Stone film in his New Year Message for 2002, calling it "great fun" and a film that "asks some very real questions" on moral issues.

In June 2007, the Church of England published Mixing it up with Harry Potter, a 48-page book designed to use parallels from the novels to teach the faith to 9–13-year-olds. The author of the book, Kent youth worker Owen Smith, argued that: "These sessions draw parallels between events in the world of Harry and his friends, and the world in which we are seeking to proclaim the gospel to young people [...]. To say, as some have, that these books draw younger readers towards the occult seems to me both to malign J. K. Rowling and to vastly underestimate the ability of children and young people to separate the real from the imaginary."

=== Latter-Day Saints ===
The Church of Jesus Christ of Latter-day Saints (LDS Church) has expressed no official or unofficial reservations or cautions about the Harry Potter books and movies, all of which are freely sold at the Brigham Young University campus bookstore. At least two prominent leaders of the church have even recommended the series and spoke of being fans because they teach morality and show good victorious over evil.

== Islam ==
A large number of Islamic scholars have argued that the books' magical themes conflict with Islamic teachings. A series of online fatwas have been logged by imams against Harry Potter, decrying it as un-Islamic.

Feiz Mohammad, an Australian Islamic preacher, decried Harry Potter for "paganism, evil, magic and the drinking of unicorn blood".

In Iran, the series is popular and published by the Ministry of Culture and Islamic Guidance. In July 2007, the daily paper Kayhan called the series "a billion-dollar Zionist project" created to "disrupt young minds". The article was ignored by the government, and the series continued to be published normally.

In August 2007, police in Karachi, Pakistan, discovered and defused a car bomb located outside a shopping centre where, hours later, the final Harry Potter novel was scheduled to go on sale. The book launch was postponed in response. A local police superintendent commented that: "We are not sure so far whether the target of the bombing was the book launch, but the connection cannot be ruled out."

== Judaism ==
Many prominent rabbis have described the Harry Potter books as, in the words of one, "a force for good". In 2005, a conference at the University of Reading debated whether Harry Potter had a "yiddishe neshama" (Jewish soul). Jonathan Sacks, Baron Sacks, the former chief Rabbi of the Commonwealth of Nations, claims that, in "a society in which adolescents are precociously adult, and adults are permanently adolescent", Harry Potter has "reclaimed the kingdom of childhood, proving that you don't have to betray to enchant".

The decision to release the final volume of the Harry Potter series, Harry Potter and the Deathly Hallows, in Israel at 02:00 on a Saturday morning drew criticism from some Israeli rabbis, since it fell during the Shabbat, a time when business dealings are forbidden. This opposition also opened legal efforts to block the Saturday release.

== Book challenges ==
The books' inclusion in public and school libraries has been frequently challenged for their focus on magic, particularly in the US, where it was ranked seventh on the list of the most challenged books in US libraries between 1990 and 2000 despite having been first published in the US in 1998. In 1999, the Harry Potter books were challenged 23 times in 13 states. According to the American Library Association (ALA), as of 2006, they are the most challenged books of the 21st century.

However, the ALA notes that, overall, opposition to Harry Potter in the US appears to be waning; having topped the list of the most challenged books in US schools in many previous years, they have since 2002 only appeared in the top ten in 2003 when they took second place and in 2019 when they took ninth place. Humanist commentator Austin Cline attributes this decline to school libraries employing "opt-out" policies, which allow parents to prohibit their children from reading books they do not wish them exposed to.

=== Challenges in the United States ===
In 1999, in response to complaints from three local parents, Zeeland, Michigan, school superintendent Gary Feenstra restricted access to the Harry Potter books to those pupils whose parents gave written permission. Later reports claimed that the parents were concerned about the books' magical and witchcraft-related themes. In response, children began a letter-writing campaign, forming clubs, and organising petitions, which ultimately merged into an internet site called Muggles for Harry Potter. Eventually, the site took on a broader remit as kidSPEAK!, a forum for children to tackle censorship in general.

In 2000, The Public Library system of Jacksonville, Florida, was faced with a lawsuit from conservative Christian group Liberty Counsel of Orlando after they began awarding "Hogwarts' Certificate of Accomplishment" to young readers who completed the fourth Harry Potter novel, Harry Potter and the Goblet of Fire. One parent complained that "If they are going to pass out witchcraft certificates they should also promote the Bible and pass out certificates of righteousness". The lawsuit was averted after the library agreed to stop awarding the certificate.

In 2002 in York, Pennsylvania, local parent Deb DiEugenio, along with her pastor, attempted to have the books banned from her daughter's school. DuEugenio said that the books were "against my daughter's constitution, it's evil, it's witchcraft. I'm not paying taxes to teach my child witchcraft." The school board eventually voted 7–2 to keep the books, with an opt-out for concerned parents.

In 2003, Billy Ray and Mary Nell Counts, a couple in Cedarville, Arkansas, brought suit against the local school board on behalf of their daughter to contest a rule requiring parents' written consent to read the Harry Potter books. A parent, Angie Haney, had requested such a rule on the grounds that they were "not based on fiction", at the prompting of Pastor Mark Hodges, who was also a member of the school board. A district court judge decided the rule was unconstitutional. The decision was cited as precedent in subsequent censorship cases.

In September 2005, Laura Mallory, a mother of four children in Loganville, Georgia, attempted to have the Harry Potter books banned from her children's school library on the grounds that they promoted a religion, Wicca, and thus for a public school library to hold them would violate the separation of church and state. On her website, she states: "Harry Potter is being used to teach and promote witchcraft, Wicca, a U.S. [Government] recognised religion, in our schools, classrooms, and to this entire generation." Mallory said the books carry "evil themes, witchcraft, demonic activity, murder, evil blood sacrifice, spells and teaching children all of this". Mallory, who is a Christian missionary, said that she believed the books encouraged children to practise religious witchcraft or become Wiccans. Mallory also commented that she has not read the entire book series because "they're really very long and I have four kids. I've put a lot of work into what I've studied and read. I think it would be hypocritical for me to read all the books, honestly." Following her case's rejection by the school, Mallory then took her case to the school appeals committee but was rejected again. On 20 April 2006, Mallory took her case to the Gwinnett County School Board, but, on 11 May, the board voted unanimously against her. In June 2006, Mallory launched an appeal against the County Board's decision with the Georgia State Board of Education; that appeal was rejected the following December. In January 2007, she appealed to the Gwinnett Superior Court; that appeal too was rejected three months later. She considered taking the case to federal court but spent the following summer with her husband and four children. She is now an ordained minister for children and young adults, claiming that her case against Harry Potter has inspired her to a new calling.

In September 2007, Pastor Ron Barker of St. Joseph Church in Wakefield, Massachusetts, received international attention after pulling the books from the shelves of the parish's K–8 school. According to the ALA, this was the first time the books were banned in Massachusetts. The Roman Catholic Archdiocese of Boston claimed this was an independent action in which the Church played no role. "It may be a great series, but for some it is a vehicle for entering into some occult practices", he said. "Sorcery and witchcraft are not appropriate subjects for a Catholic school and I do not want parents or children thinking we approve of them in our library." He claimed his actions were no different from protecting children with a peanut allergy; "What I did is start a spiritual peanut butter ban on Harry Potter", he said.

=== Challenges in the Commonwealth ===
In 2000, Carol Rookwood, headmistress of St Mary's Island Church of England Aided School in Chatham, Kent, England, banned the books from school grounds, saying that: "The Bible is very clear and consistent in its teachings that wizards, devils and demons exist and are very real, powerful and dangerous, and God's people are told to have nothing to do with them." In response, the chair of the Church of England's doctrine commission, Stephen Sykes, said: "The Church's position is that magic and sorcery are contrary to the Christian religion, Mrs Rookwood is absolutely right. [But] children who are capable of reading Harry Potter could be told not to take witchcraft seriously, or might even realise that for themselves." In July 2000, Birkenhead Primary School in Auckland, New Zealand, placed a ban on the Harry Potter novels being read aloud by teachers in class after parental complaints regarding the books' supposedly occult content. However, the ban was lifted after a number of students and parents complained. Also in 2000, Christian parents complained to the school board in Durham Region, Ontario, about Harry Potter and managed to get the books removed from school library shelves. The books were reinstated after a public outcry.

In July 2006, Sariya Allan, a teaching assistant at Durand Primary School in Stockwell, South London, quit her job after she was suspended for refusing to listen to a seven-year-old pupil read a Harry Potter book in class. A practising Pentecostal, she told the girl that "I don't do witchcraft in any form" and that she would be "cursed" if she heard the novel recited. Allan took her dispute with the school to an employment tribunal, citing religious discrimination and claiming for damages. The case was heard in June 2007, and the tribunal found in favour of the school.

=== Challenges in other countries ===
In 2003, a Russian woman filed charges against Rosman Publishing, responsible for Harry Potter's Russian translation, saying that the books "instilled religious extremism and prompted students to join religious organizations of Satanist followers". The Moscow Prosecutor's Office declined to press the charges because there were "no grounds" for the case.

== Responses to criticism ==
=== Wicca ===
In response to the criticism that the books promote Wicca, a number of Wiccans and other commenters have argued that the critics' definition of Wicca tends to lump together many and various spiritualist practices that actually have little in common. They have also highlighted the differences between magic within Wicca, which is invocational and derives from the divine powers, and that depicted by the Harry Potter books, which is a purely mechanical application of spells without invoking any deities. A Wiccan review of Harry Potter: Witchcraft Repackaged pointed out that "communing with the dead and spirit world, sorcery, curses, occult symbology, black magic [and] demon possession"—all cited by the book as evidence of Harry Potter promoting Wicca—are not part of Wiccan belief.

Divinatory practices such as scrying and astrology, although occasionally employed by characters in the books, are neither unique nor central to the Wiccan religion and are treated in the novels in a condescending tongue-in-cheek manner; the school divination teacher is, according to writer Christine Schoeffer, "a misty, dreamy, dewy charlatan" who is ridiculed by the students and staff alike. In the Harry Potter universe, Schoeffer claims "the entire intuitive tradition of fortune-telling [...] is discredited".

The Ontario Consultants on Religious Tolerance says, in their analysis of Chick's "The Nervous Witch", that the comic's heroine cries that "she got into 'The Craft' (i.e. Wicca) 'Through the Harry Potter books! We wanted his powers ... so we called for spirit guides. Then they came into us.' In reality, spirit guides are unrelated to the Witchcraft in the Harry Potter books and are not sought by Wiccans. They are a New Age phenomenon."

=== Occult vs. fantasy and fairytale magic ===
Regardless, statements such as those in Witchcraft Repackaged that the books depict actual occultist practices of any kind have been roundly criticised. Christian writer Stephen D. Greydanus writes that the magic of the Harry Potter novels is not the ritualistic invocational magic of Wicca or occultism but the same "fantasy" magic practised in the works of J. R. R. Tolkien and C. S. Lewis; "If anything, the magic in Rowling's world is even more emphatically imaginary, even further removed from real-world practices, than that of Tolkien or Lewis; and, like theirs, presents no appreciable risk of direct imitative behaviour." Christianity Today columnist Charles Colson asserts that the magic in Harry Potter is "purely mechanical, as opposed to occultic. That is, Harry and his friends cast spells, read crystal balls, and turn themselves into animals—but they don't make contact with a supernatural world. [It's not] the kind of real-life witchcraft the Bible condemns." Austin Cline notes that: "The Harry Potter books simply aren't about Wicca as it is currently practiced. J.K. Rowling researched Wiccan practices and incorporated a few elements in order to give her books a bit more of an air of reality, but she and Wicca are drawing upon the same corpus of ancient traditions and stories so similarities are inevitable. They certainly aren't a sign that the books work to 'indoctrinate' people into Wicca as a religion."

Connie Neal has commented that "there are 64 real references to witchcraft in the first four Harry Potter books, but you have to see them in context to know they are not teaching witchcraft or sorcery. Many of the detractors who have actually read the books already have made up their mind that Harry Potter is evil before they read. They have taken a magnifying glass and picked at the books, using literary reductionism to find what they want to find. You can pick up Dickens' A Christmas Carol and do the same thing that these people have done with Harry Potter; it is ridiculous."

In 2001, Massimo Introvigne, an Italian expert in emerging religious movements, criticised the Fundamentalist impulse to distrust fantasy. "Fundamentalists reject, or even burn, all products of contemporary popular culture, because their modes of production, languages and styles are not intrinsically Christian [...]. Most children understand that magic is used in fairy tales and juvenile supernatural fiction as a century-old language, and that this is fiction, not reality. If we dismiss the use of magic as a language, we should at least be fundamentalist to the bitter end, and go against 'Mary Poppins,' 'Peter Pan,' and 'Sleeping Beauty,' and insist that Cinderella puts a burkha on."

=== Secularism ===
Another response to the claim that the books promote the religion of witchcraft, which has been raised as much by Christians critical of the books as those who support them, is that, far from promoting religion, the books do not promote religion in any way. Apart from celebrating Christmas and Easter and a non-denominational clergyman presiding at both Dumbledore's funeral and the Weasleys' wedding, religious practices are largely absent from the books. In her critical editorial on the books, Focus on the Family's Lindy Beam comments: "The spiritual fault of Harry Potter is not so much that Rowling is playing to dark supernatural powers, but that she doesn't acknowledge any supernatural powers at all. These stories are not fueled by witchcraft, but by secularism." The Harry Potter books have been lauded by atheists and secularists for their determinedly nonreligious outlook. Mika LaVaque-Manty of the liberal website Left2Right notes: "Religion plays no role in the books. There are no churches, no other religious institutions, nobody prays or meditates, and even funerals are non-religious affairs." When considering the role of religion within Harry Potter and the Deathly Hallows, Christopher Hitchens observed the apparent secularism in the novel, stating that the characters of Harry and Hermione possess certain moral virtues while also expressing an ignorance of Christian ideas. In a Time magazine article entitled "Who Dies in Harry Potter? God", written before the publication of the seventh and final book in the series, Lev Grossman argues that: "Harry Potter lives in a world free of any religion or spirituality of any kind. He lives surrounded by ghosts but has no one to pray to, even if he were so inclined, which he isn't." Grossman goes on to contrast Harry Potter with other more explicitly religious fantasies, such as C. S. Lewis's The Chronicles of Narnia and J. R. R. Tolkien's The Lord of the Rings.

=== Rowling's response ===
J. K. Rowling has repeatedly denied that her books lead children into witchcraft. In an interview with CNN in 1999, she said,

I absolutely did not start writing these books to encourage any child into witchcraft. I'm laughing slightly because to me, the idea is absurd. I have met thousands of children and not even one time has a child come up to me and said, "Ms Rowling, I'm so glad I've read these books because now I want to be a witch."

"Practicing Wiccans think I'm also a witch.", Rowling told Entertainment Weekly in 2000. "I'm not."

"People underestimate children so hugely.", Rowling said when asked about the controversy in the 2001 documentary Harry Potter and Me, "They know it's fiction. When people are arguing from that kind of standpoint, I don't think reason works tremendously well. But I would be surprised if some of them had read the books at all."

In a conversation on Twitter in December 2014, Rowling tweeted: "To everyone asking whether their religion/belief/non-belief system is represented at Hogwarts: the only people I never imagined there are Wiccans. [...] [I]t's a different concept of magic to the one laid out in the books, so I don't really see how they can co-exist."

== Christianity in the novels ==
While many describe the books as secular or Satanic, many writers, including Rowling herself, have gone to great lengths to demonstrate that the books actively promote Christian values.

=== Rowling's personal beliefs ===
Rowling attended a Church of Scotland congregation while writing Harry Potter, and her eldest daughter, Jessica, was baptised into that faith. "I go to church myself", she told MTV in 2007. "I don't take any responsibility for the lunatic fringes of my own religion." In 2000, when asked if she was a Christian by journalist Max Wyman of the Vancouver Sun, she replied:

Yes, I am, which seems to offend the religious right far worse than if I said I thought there was no God. Every time I've been asked if I believe in God, I've said yes, because I do, but no one ever really has gone any more deeply into it than that, and I have to say that does suit me, because if I talk too freely about that I think the intelligent reader, whether 10 or 60, will be able to guess what's coming in the books.

"Personally", she said of her religious faith, "I think you can see that in the books. Of course, Hogwarts is a multifaith school." Rowling claims to have been very careful not to colour her novels in an overtly religious way, lest one faith be given prominence over any other. Rowling said that, to her, the moral significance of the tales seems "blindingly obvious". The key for her was the choice between what is right and what is easy "because that, that is how tyranny is started, with people being apathetic and taking the easy route and suddenly finding themselves in deep trouble"., In an interview with MTV after the publication of the last book, she is quoted as saying: "To me [the religious parallels have] always been obvious, but I never wanted to talk too openly about it because I thought it might show people who just wanted the story where we were going."

In 2007, Rowling described her religious background in an interview with the Dutch newspaper de Volkskrant:

I was officially raised in the Church of England, but I was actually more of a freak in my family. We didn't talk about religion in our home. My father didn't believe in anything, neither did my sister. My mother would incidentally visit the church, but mostly during Christmas. And I was immensely curious. From when I was 13, 14 I went to church alone. I found it very interesting what was being said there, and I believed in it. When I went to university, I became more critical. I got more annoyed with the smugness of religious people and I went to church less and less. Now I'm at the point where I started: yes, I believe. And yes, I go to the church. A protestant church here in Edinburgh. My husband is also raised protestant, but he comes from a very strict Scottish group. One where they couldn't sing and talk.

Rowling has occasionally experienced doubt about her religious faith. In a British documentary, JK Rowling: A Year in the Life, when asked if she believed in God, she said: "Yes. I do struggle with it; I couldn't pretend that I'm not doubt-ridden about a lot of things and that would be one of them but I would say yes." When asked if she believed in an afterlife, she said: "Yes; I think I do." In a 2008 interview with the Spanish newspaper El País, Rowling said: "I feel very drawn to religion, but at the same time I feel a lot of uncertainty. I live in a state of spiritual flux. I believe in the permanence of the soul."

=== Rowling and the Inklings ===
Several Christian writers have compared Rowling to the Inklings, a group that included C. S. Lewis, J. R. R. Tolkien, and Charles Williams, who explored Christian themes and morality in a fantasy context. Dave Kopel, citing John Granger's book, draws comparisons between Rowling's and Lewis's common usage of Christian symbols, such as lions, unicorns, and stags. He compares the work to Lewis's Christian allegory: "In the climax of Chamber of Secrets, Harry descends to a deep underworld, is confronted by two satanic minions (Voldemort and a giant serpent), is saved from certain death by his faith in Dumbledore (the bearded God the Father/Ancient of Days), rescues the virgin (Virginia [sic] Weasley), and ascends in triumph. It's Pilgrim's Progress for a new audience." (This quotation predates Rowling's revelation that Ginny Weasley's full name is Ginevra, not Virginia.)

Other Christian writers find Rowling's treatment of magic less acceptable than Lewis's and Tolkien's. In his essay "Harry Potter vs. Gandalf", Steven D. Greydanus notes that, in the works of Tolkien and Lewis, magic is confined to alien realms with their own laws, whereas Rowling's world coexists with our own; he thinks this is wrong: "Lewis goes to great lengths to make clear just how dangerous and wrong, how incompatible with Christianity, is any form of attempted magic in our world." John Andrew Murray similarly observes that Rowling's work portrays magic as a natural force to be manipulated, while Lewis and Tolkien portray magic as a gift bestowed by a higher power: "Despite superficial similarities, Rowling's and Lewis' worlds are as far apart as east is from west. Rowling's work invites children to a world where witchcraft is 'neutral' and where authority is determined solely by one's cleverness. Lewis invites readers to a world where God's authority is not only recognised, but celebrated—a world that resounds with His goodness and care."

"I adored [Lewis's books] when I was a child.", Rowling told The Sydney Morning Herald in 2001. "I got so caught up I didn't think C. S. Lewis was especially preachy. Reading them now I find that his subliminal message isn't very subliminal." In an interview with Lev Grossman in 2005, she said: "There comes a point [in Lewis's The Last Battle] where Susan, who was the older girl, is lost to Narnia because she becomes interested in lipstick. She's become irreligious basically because she found sex. I have a big problem with that."

"I did not set out to convert anyone to Christianity.", she told Time in 2007. "I wasn't trying to do what C. S. Lewis did. It is perfectly possible to live a very moral life without a belief in God, and I think it's perfectly possible to live a life peppered with ill-doing and believe in God."

Regarding Tolkien, Rowling said in 2000 that: "I didn't read The Hobbit until after the first Harry book was written, though I read Lord of the Rings when I was nineteen. I think, setting aside the obvious fact that we both use myth and legend, that the similarities are fairly superficial. Tolkien created a whole new mythology, which I would never claim to have done. On the other hand, I think I have better jokes."

=== Christian allegories in Deathly Hallows ===
A number of commentators have drawn attention to the Biblical themes and references in her final Harry Potter novel, Harry Potter and the Deathly Hallows. In an August 2007 issue of Newsweek, Lisa Miller commented that Harry dies and then comes back to life to save mankind, like Jesus. She points out the title of the chapter in which this occurs—"King's Cross"—a possible allusion to Jesus's cross. Also, she outlines the scene in which Harry is temporarily dead, pointing out that it places Harry in a very heaven-like setting where he talks to a father figure "whose supernatural powers are accompanied by a profound message of love". Miller argues that these parallels make it difficult to believe that the basis of the stories is Satanic. There is also speculation from The Leaky Cauldron's podcast, PotterCast, episode 115 entitled "Those Deathly Hallows", in the Canon Conclusion segment with Steve Vander Ark, that the Hallows act as a parallel to the Trinity; Harry accepts death as did Jesus, they both come back from death, and defeat the Devil (portrayed as Voldemort). Jeffrey Weiss adds, in The Dallas Morning News, that the biblical quotation "The last enemy that shall be destroyed is death.", featured on the tombstones of Harry's parents, refers to Jesus's victory over death at the end of the world. The quotation on Dumbledore's family tomb, "Where your treasure is, there your heart will be also.", is from Matthew 6:21 and refers to knowing which things in life are of true value. "They're very British books.", Rowling revealed to an Open Book conference in October 2007. "So on a very practical note Harry was going to find biblical quotations on tombstones, [but] I think those two particular quotations he finds on the tombstones at Godric's Hollow, [...] almost epitomise the whole series." Tom Willow stated that: "Harry Potter going knowingly to his death at the hands of Voldemort, willing to sacrifice himself to save his friends, is reminiscent of Aslan similarly sacrificing himself in C. S. Lewis' The Lion, the Witch and the Wardrobe. There is no doubt that Aslan's sacrifice was modeled by Lewis on Jesus Christ going to Golgotha. It is logical to assume that, directly or indirectly, that was also the model for Harry Potter's sacrifice."

Deathly Hallows begins with a pair of epigraphs, one by Quaker leader William Penn and one from Aeschylus's The Libation Bearers. "I really enjoyed choosing those two quotations because one is pagan, of course, and one is from a Christian tradition.", Rowling said. "I'd known it was going to be those two passages since 'Chamber' was published. I always knew [that] if I could use them at the beginning of book seven then I'd cued up the ending perfectly. If they were relevant, then I went where I needed to go. They just say it all to me, they really do."

Raymond Keating also outlines several Christian themes of the last book in an article in Newsday, concluding that: "It's possible to read Lord of the Rings and Narnia without recognizing the religious aspects. That's even more so the case with Harry Potter. But Christian themes are there nonetheless." Christian commentator Jerry Bowyer says of Rowling's "fundamentalist bashers", "So much of the religious right failed to see the Christianity in the Potter novels because it knows so little Christianity itself [...]. The gospel stories themselves, the various metaphors and figures of the Law and the Prophets, and their echoes down through the past two millennia of Christian literature and art are largely unknown to vast swaths of American Christendom." Regarding Rowling's belief that discussing her faith would spoil the books, Bowyer says: "For once, I disagree with her: I don't think [the bashers] would have guessed the ending. Most of them can't recognise the ending of the story even after it's been told."

In her appraisal of the series, The Mystery of Harry Potter: A Catholic Family Guide, author Nancy Carpentier Brown writes:

After burying the remains of Mad-Eye Moody, Harry "marked the spot by gouging a small cross in the bark with his wand." Now, if they were true Wiccans, wouldn't he have gouged a pentagram? When Harry finally has the chance to face Voldemort (Tom Riddle) and possibly kill him, Harry pauses and offers Voldemort a chance, saying, "Show some remorse." [...] Giving a person a chance to redeem themselves, to begin to realise your own sins, by showing remorse, shows a Christian theme to the story.

== Dumbledore's sexual orientation ==
On 19 October 2007, Rowling spoke at New York City's Carnegie Hall. When asked by a fan whether Albus Dumbledore, the books' wise mentor-figure, "who believed in the prevailing power of love, ever [fell] in love himself", Rowling replied:

My truthful answer to you... I always thought of Dumbledore as gay. [...] Dumbledore fell in love with [Gellert] Grindelwald, and that added to his horror when Grindelwald showed himself to be what he was [...] [F]alling in love can blind us to an extent[.] [...] [H]e was very drawn to this brilliant person, and horribly, terribly let down by him.

The statement was met with an ovation from the audience. "If I'd known it would make you so happy, I would have announced it years ago!", Rowling said.

Christians critical of both Harry Potter and homosexuality responded pointedly to the revelation. Christian author Berit Kjos, for instance, said that Rowling's statement furthered his opposition to the books, as Rowling "has introduced values that are contrary to the Biblical message". Laura Mallory responded to Rowling's statement by telling US network ABC that the books are "a subtle indoctrination into anti-Christian values [...]. A homosexual lifestyle is a harmful one."

Rowling commented on the dispute in an interview with the BBC. "Do I think a gay person can be a moral compass? I think it's ludicrous that we are asking that question in the 21st century. The Christian fundamentalists were never my base."

== Sources ==
- Ciaccio, Peter (2009). "Harry Potter and Christian Theology". In Elizabeth E. Heilman (ed.). Critical Perspectives on Harry Potter (2nd ed.). Routledge, London and New York: Routledge. pp. 33–46. ISBN 9780203892817.
- Юренко, Юрий; Юренко, Анастасия (2020). "Гарри Поттер и православное сообщество: опыт контент-анализа". Этнодиалоги (in Russian). 4 (62): 142–166. doi:10.37492/ETNO.2020.62.4.006.
