= Mischief Management =

Fan convention company

Mischief Management, LLC
- Type: Private
- Industry: Event management
- Founded: 2011
- Founder: Melissa Anelli; Stephanie Dornhelm
- Headquarters: United States
- Key people: Melissa Anelli, CEO
- Services: Fan convention production
- Website: www.mischiefmanagement.com

Mischief Management, LLC is a company that organizes fan conventions, including BroadwayCon, LeakyCon, GeekyCon, Con of Thrones, EnchantiCon, Obsessed Fest, and PodX.

In March 2026, they were heavily criticized for their mismanagement and poor production of Barbie Dream Fest in Fort Lauderdale. The company had previously faced criticism for its handling of Obsessed Fest in 2023 and RomanceCon in 2025.

On March 31, 2026, the audio-visual provider for Barbie Dream Fest sued Mischief Management for non-payment.

== Background ==
In 2009, Melissa Anelli of the fan site "The Leaky Cauldron" produced a Harry Potter themed fan event using US$7,500 (Note: BuzzFeed News stated US$7,500 in 2015; Crain's New York printed US$10,000 in 2018.) of her own money. In 2010, the crew who had run LeakyCon in 2009 coordinated with Hank and John Green to organize the inaugural VidCon under the name "Mischief Management Services".

In 2011, Anelli established Mischief Management, LLC as a convention production company with her business partner Stephanie Dornhelm.

Mischief Management was perceived as a connection between the wizard rock bands and the larger Harry Potter fandom for LeakyCon, the temporary GeekyCon, and VidCon.

== Events ==
Some of the events that Mischief Management has been involved with over the years, listed in order of the inaugural convention for each event.

=== LeakyCon ===
LeakyCon ran from 2009 to 2024. Initially promoted as a charity event, the convention focused on the Harry Potter fandom but grew to encompass other fandoms, eventually leading to organizers splitting the convention so that LeakyCon could return to being solely a Harry Potter convention. The change did not last, and in 2021, Anelli stated that LeakyCon would not change names again.

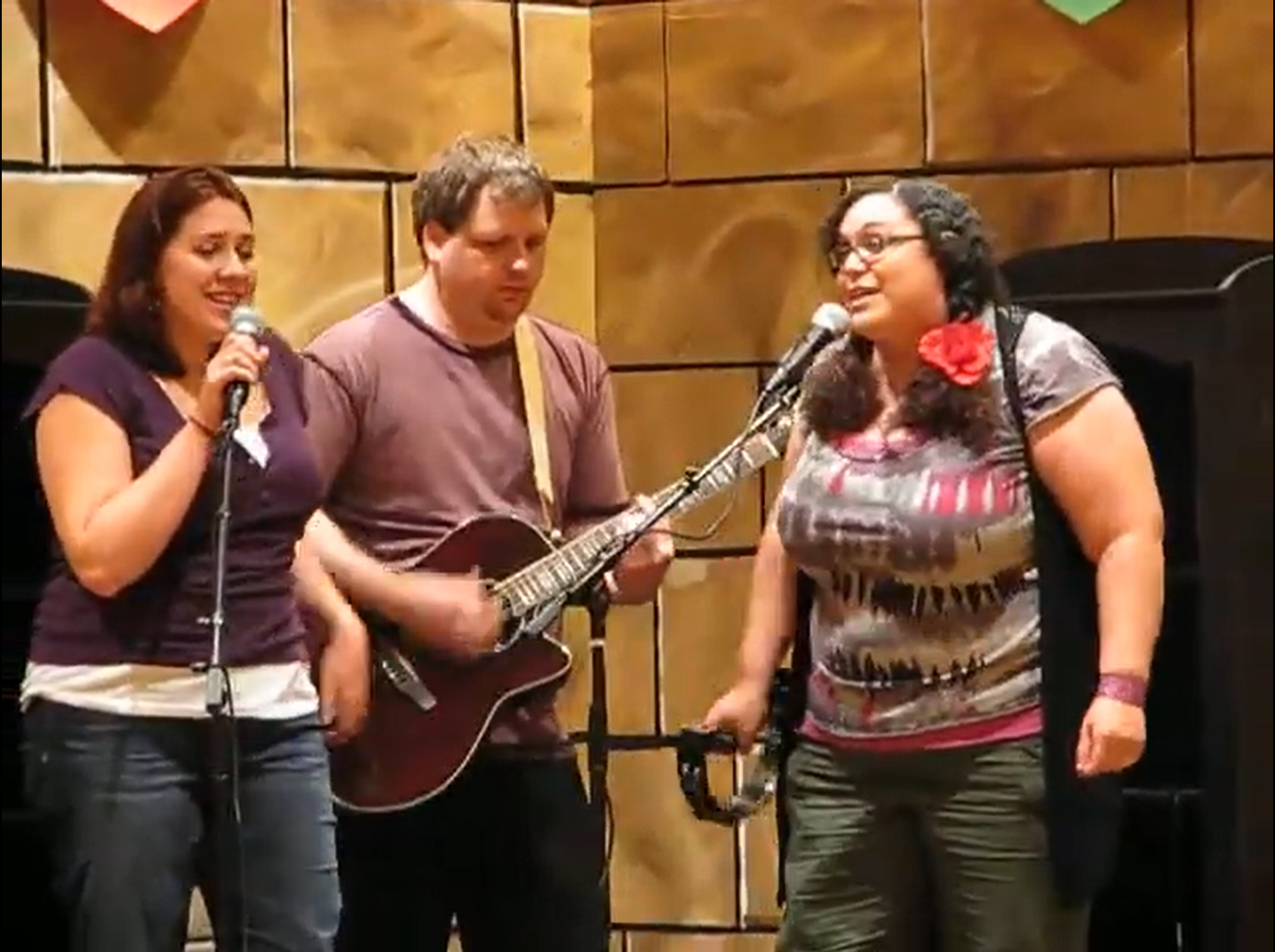
Wizarding rock band Hawthorn and Holly performing their song "La La Luna" at LeakyCon 2011.

The first LeakyCon was held in Boston, Massachusetts, May 21–24, 2009 at the Park Plaza Hilton, with an attendance of 750. The second convention took place in Orlando, Florida at Loews Royal Pacific Resort from July 13–17, 2011, with an attendance of 3,400. In addition to panels being broadcast over SiriusXM from July 15–18, LeakyCon attendees were able to tour The Wizarding World of Harry Potter after park hours overnight July 13.

The third LeakyCon took place August 9–12, 2012 at the Hilton Chicago, with an attendance of 3,800. Two conventions were held in 2013: Portland, Oregon, from June 27–30, at the Oregon Convention Center with an attendance of 5,000; and London, England, from August 8–11, at the Grand Connaught Rooms with an attendance limited to 1,500.

LeakyCon returned to Orlando for July 30 to August 3, 2014, this time held at the Orange County Convention Center, with another after hours event at Universal Orlando. Approximately 1,500 attendees had tickets for the special event; total attendance at the convention was estimated as surpassing 5,000. At the close of the convention, Anelli announced that the existing LeakyCon, as a multiple fandom convention, would be rebranded as GeekyCon, with the LeakyCon name returning to being a Harry Potter only convention. GeekyCon was the only convention Mischief Management organised in 2015.

The next LeakyCon was held October 19–23, 2016, at the Marriott Hotel in Burbank, California. It was promoted as an "immersive" experience, with attendance limited to 500. The 2017 convention took place at the Citywest Hotel in Saggart, Ireland, August 31 to September 3. Today FM reported attendance as being in the "thousands". The 2018 convention was held at the Kay Bailey Hutchison Convention Center in Dallas, Texas, for August 10–12, 2018. There were a total of 18,000 attendees.

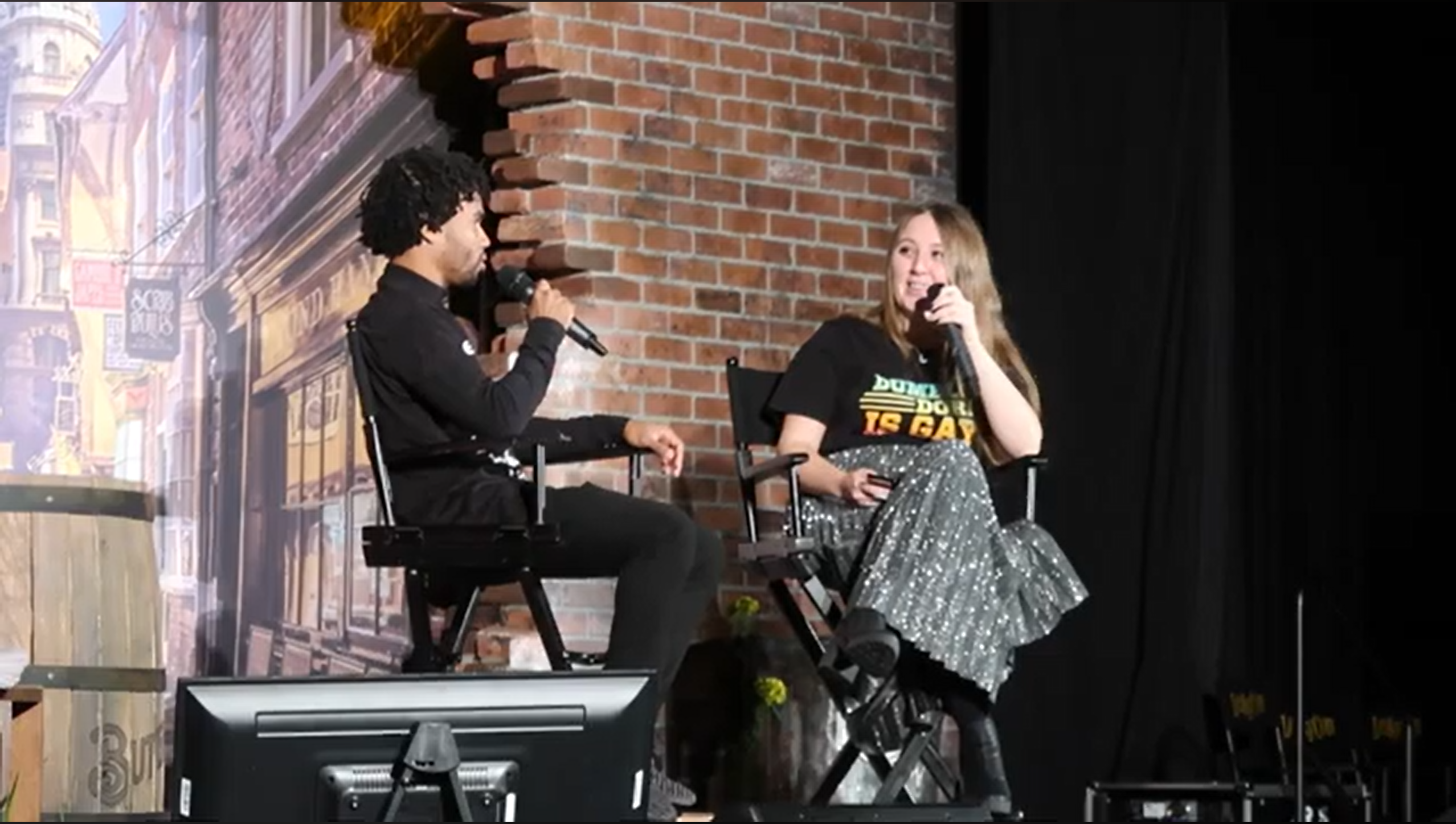
Luke Youngblood at a Q&A at LeakyCon 2019, Boston.

For 2019, LeakyCon appeared at events in three cities. Two were LeakyCons: the first again in Dallas, August 9–11, at the Kay Bailey Hutchison Convention Center, with an attendance of approximately 10,000. The second was held October 11–13, at the Seaport Hotel and Seaport World Trade Center. In between these two events, LeakyCon was present at the Rose City Comic Con in Portland, Oregon from September 13–15.

Because of COVID-19, LeakyCon's 2020 and 2021 conventions were postponed. Two conventions were held in 2022, the first in Orlando, July 29–31, at the Orange County Convention Center; the second in Denver, Colorado, October 14–16, at the Crowne Plaza Denver Airport Convention Center.

At the beginning of 2023, Anelli announced that LeakyCon would be distancing itself from being a Harry Potter convention. The 2023 convention was held in Chicago, Illinois, August 4–6, at McCormick Place South. The final convention was held at the Oregon Convention Center in Portland, July 5–7, 2024, and had a reported attendance of 2,800.

The convention rebranded as EnchantiCon, as announced at the final LeakyCon in July 2024.

Attendees were "an intersection of largely female, queer-friendly youth cultures". Panels included discussions on civil liberties, the cultural impact of Harry Potter as a "phenomenon", its impact on literature, and social justice. Critique also extended to literary analysis and the question of objective consumption of the series. Some panels debated what material constitutes the canon of Harry Potter. At some of the conventions, they broached controversial social issues, expanding the context of depictions in Harry Potter to the real world and allowing debate of issues such as civil rights, white privilege, and segregation. Panels also included critique of Harry Potter in relation to diversity, which extended to the representation of Korean history in relation to Fantastic Beasts: The Crimes of Grindelwald, specifically with respect to Nagini.

=== GeekyCon ===
GeekyCon was split off from LeakyCon in 2014 as a fantasy-focused convention. It was held in the Orange County Convention Center, July 30 – August 2, 2015, with Orange County mayor Teresa Jacobs officially declaring July 31, 2015 as "Geek Day". Convention organizer Stephanie Dornhelm stated that the name change was a reflection of how LeakyCon had expanded to include intellectual properties that were beloved by fans of Harry Potter but not related to the series. Represented fandoms included Doctor Who, Supernatural, Glee, the Marvel Cinematic Universe, Disney, The Hunger Games, Game of Thrones, and The Hobbit. 2015 guests included Veronica Roth, Ransom Riggs, Dominic Barnes, Curt Mega, Titus Makin Jr., Kim Rhodes, and Anthony Rapp.

GeekyCon was the only event Mischief Management produced in 2015. Like at LeakyCon in 2011 and 2014, convention attendees had the option of purchasing "Open at the Close" tickets for a special event inside Universal Orlando.

The event returned to the same venue July 29–31, 2016. Guests included Curt Mega, Dominic Barnes, Titus Makin Jr., Kim Rhodes, James Moran, Ashley Clements, Mary Kate Wiles, Joanna Sotomura, Dayeanne Hutton, and Brent Bailey, with music from wrock groups Harry and the Potters and the Whomping Willows.

On April 7, 2017, Anelli announced on Tumblr that GeekyCon was on hiatus.

=== BroadwayCon ===
BroadwayCon is a fan convention dedicated to Broadway theatre, musical theatre and live stage entertainment. It was developed by Mischief Management founders Melissa Anelli and Stephanie Dornhelm with actor Anthony Rapp, and grew partly out of Anelli's experience organizing LeakyCon and Rapp's connection to early Rent fan culture. Rapp described the event as fan-centered rather than industry-directed, with programming intended to let theater artists interact directly with audiences through panels, performances, workshops, autograph and photo opportunities and meet-and-greets.

The first BroadwayCon was held January 22–24, 2016, at the New York Hilton Midtown. The inaugural convention drew thousands of attendees and continued during the January 2016 United States blizzard, which shut down Broadway performances on January 23. Programming included panels, workshops, fan meetups, performances, a 20th-anniversary Rent reunion and a Hamilton panel featuring Lin-Manuel Miranda and members of the original Broadway cast.

After the first convention sold out the New York Hilton Midtown, BroadwayCon moved to the Jacob K. Javits Convention Center for its 2017 and 2018 events. In January 2017, shortly before the second convention, the Actors' Equity Association placed BroadwayCon on its "do not work" list over payment terms for Equity performers. BroadwayCon and Actors' Equity reached a three-year agreement later that year establishing standard contracts for Equity members and provisions for shorter convention appearances.

BroadwayCon returned to the New York Hilton Midtown for its 2019 and 2020 conventions. The New York Times reported that the 2019 event drew an estimated 7,000 attendees over three days, with nearly 200 hours of sessions. During the COVID-19 pandemic, BroadwayCon's 2021 event was held online, and the convention returned to in-person programming in 2022 at the Manhattan Center and New Yorker Hotel after being postponed from February to July because of rising COVID-19 cases.

In the 2020s, BroadwayCon programming included panels focused on representation, access and working conditions in theater. The 2023 convention at the New York Marriott Marquis emphasized diversity and the future of the industry, while the 2024 convention at the New York Hilton Midtown included programming on mental health, sobriety, body image, autism and accessibility. The 10th BroadwayCon was held February 7–9, 2025, at the New York Marriott Marquis, and the 2026 convention was held January 23–25 in Times Square, with mainstage programming at Palladium Times Square and additional programming and the Marketplace at The New York Westin at Times Square.

In October 2025, the Supreme Court of the State of New York, New York County, issued a decision in a contract dispute involving the 2023 BroadwayCon event at the New York Marriott Marquis. Marriott International alleged that Mischief Management owed $27,861.53 under a contract for the event; the court dismissed Marriott's motion for a default judgment without prejudice.

=== Con of Thrones ===
Con of Thrones was an unofficial fan convention focused on the HBO television series Game of Thrones and George R. R. Martin's A Song of Ice and Fire series, produced by Mischief Management in partnership with fansite "Watchers on the Wall" and the podcast Game of Owns.

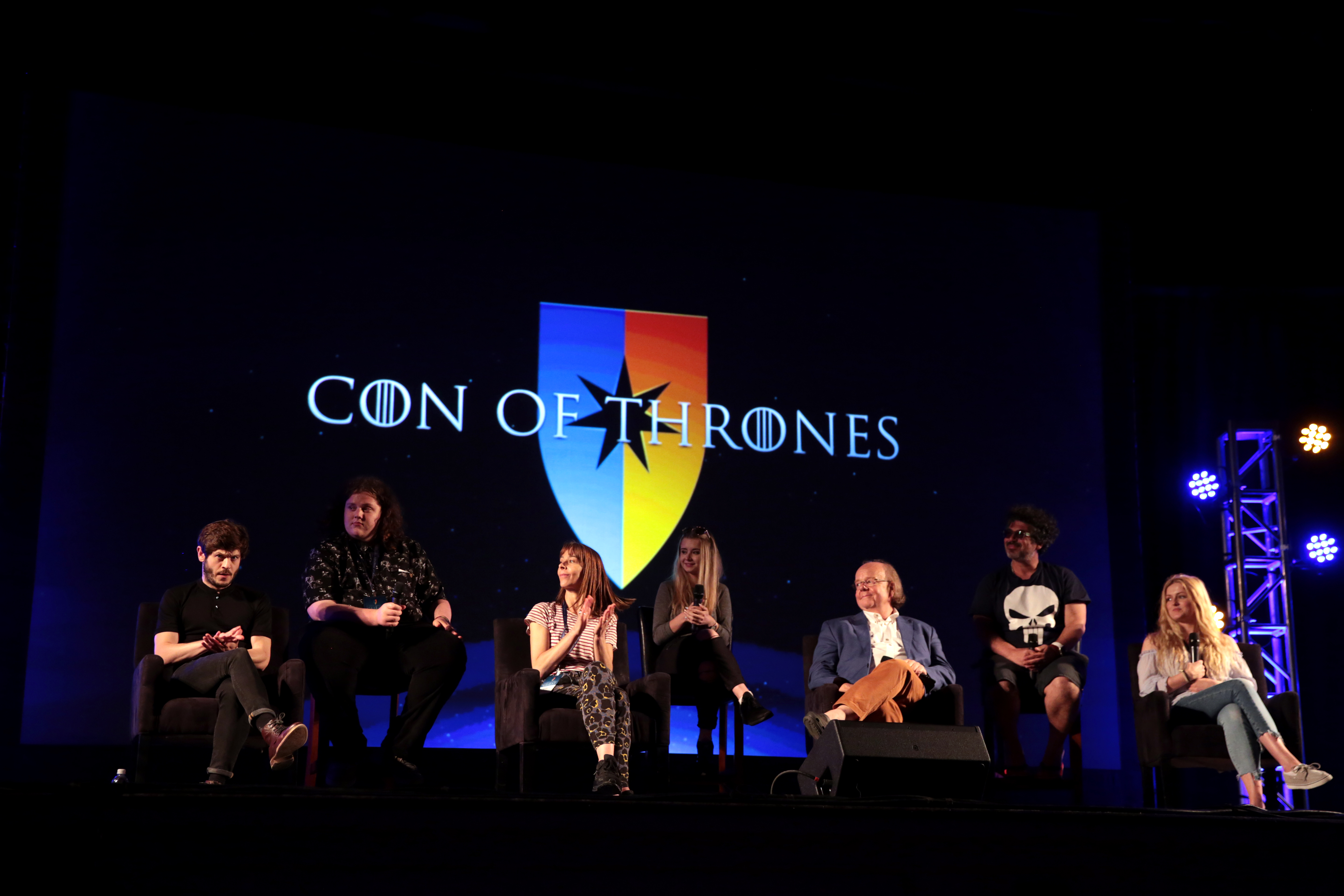
Iwan Rheon, Sam Coleman, Kate Dickie, Kerry Ingram, Roger Ashton-Griffiths, Miltos Yerolemou and Aimee Richardson speaking at the 2017 Con of Thrones at the Gaylord Opryland Resort & Convention Center in Nashville, Tennessee

It originated as A Con of Ice and Fire, first held in Nashville, Tennessee, from June 30 to July 2, 2017. Zack Luye of the Game of Owns podcast directed the event, which had 35 different vendors in attendance and featured 120 hours of activity. According to The Verge, it was "the first full-scale fan convention" dedicated to the franchise.

Subsequent events were held in Dallas (2018) and Nashville (2019). Fan organizations and media platforms within the fandom collaborated on the programming, which included panel discussions, live podcasts, performances, and fan-driven discussions exploring themes, characters, and theories related to the franchise. Autograph sessions, photo opportunities, and interactive experiences such as workshops and themed activities were also included.

The convention featured appearances by cast members from the television series, including Nikolaj Coster-Waldau, Jerome Flynn, Hannah Murray, Miltos Yerolemou, Kate Dickie and others, alongside creators, podcasters, and fan community leaders.

==== Cancellation ====
Con of Thrones was scheduled for July 17–19, 2020 at the Orange County Convention Center in Orlando, but it was cancelled due to the COVID-19 pandemic. The 2021 con was also scheduled to be held in Orlando, but was cancelled over concerns of not being able to meet attendee expectations.

HBO announced an official convention to be held in Las Vegas February 18–20, 2022, but that event was postponed until December 9–11, 2022 and moved to Los Angeles.

No Con of Thrones event was announced in 2022.

Organizers cancelled the 2023 event, also planned for Orlando, citing concerns over the political and legislative climate in Florida and its potential impact on attendees, guests, and partners. Despite slower ticket sales, the event had been expected to draw several thousand attendees.

=== AlienCon ===
Beginning in 2018, Mischief Management collaborated with A&E Networks to produce AlienCon.

The event in Pasadena, California, held June 15–17, 2018 at the Pasadena Convention Center, featured David Duchovny, Sean Astin, Mary McDonnell, Gates McFadden, Bill Mumy, Mitch Pileggi, Ramy Romany, Erich von Däniken, Travis S. Taylor, David Hatcher Childress, Linda Moulton Howe, George Noory, Nick Pope, and Giorgio A. Tsoukalos, and brought together a crowd of 20,000.

Robert Picardo, Michael Dorn, Jenna Coleman, and Travis Walton were among celebrities at the Baltimore AlienCon held from November 9–11, 2018 at the Baltimore Convention Center, with Tsoukalos, von Däniken, Hatcher Childress, and Moulton Howe also appearing. Though the convention had been produced prior to Mischief Management's involvement, the Baltimore event was the first AlienCon held on the East Coast. More than 15,000 people attended.

The company also handled the June 21–23, 2019, convention at the Staples Center in Los Angeles, with William Shatner among the invited celebrities.

The partnership continued with AlienCon Dallas, held October 4–6, 2019, at the Kay Bailey Hutchison Convention Center Dallas.

=== PodX ===
PodX was a convention for fans of podcasts held in Nashville, Tennessee from May 31 to June 2, 2019. Panels featured LGBTQIA+, BIPOC, and women podcasters, as well as experts offering tips on how to interview subjects, audio quality, and monetization. The event took place at the Music City Center and was sponsored by Stitcher, Vox Media, Wondery, and Book Riot. The convention drew an audience of approximately 300.

Mischief Management later rebranded the event as PodcastCon, planned for Chicago in 2020. It was later postponed for August 2021. Updates in 2021 stated that the event had been postponed due to the COVID-19 pandemic, with tickets for both the 2020 and 2021 events to be refunded by August 20, 2021.

=== Obsessed Fest ===
Obsessed Fest was a fan convention focused on true crime podcasts and media, organized in association with the Obsessed Network and produced by Mischief Management, with tickets sold through Indiegogo.

The 2022 event took place from September 30 to October 2 at the Hyatt Regency Columbus in Columbus, Ohio. It featured panels, live shows, and meet-and-greets for podcast personalities, including Kristin Caruso, Rabia Chaudry, Damien Echols, Brandi Eagan, Daisy Eagan, Justin Evans, Kevin Flynn, Maggie Freleng, Aaron Habel, Sarah Hagi, Patrick Hinds, Amber Hunt, Ash Kelley, Scaachi Koul, Rebecca Lavoie, Payne Lindsey, Ellyn Marsh, Gillian Pensavalle, Tim Pilleri, Tim Reenstierna, Bob Ruff, Rebekah Sebastian, Joey Taranto, and Alaina Urquhart. It also featured karaoke, drag bingo, makeup tutorials, book signings, tarot readings, and a drag brunch.

The 2023 event took place from October 20–22 at the Kay Bailey Hutchison Convention Center in Dallas, Texas. Featured podcasters included Josh Hallmark and Amanda Rossmann, alongside returning podcasters Chaudry, Evans, Freleng, Habel, Hunt, and Lindsey. Live tapings for Generation Why, Let's Go to Court!, Life after MLM, Rabia and Ellyn Solve the Case, RedHanded, Sinisterhood, Strange & Unexplained, Survivor Squad, True Crime Obsessed, Truth & Justice, and Wine and Crime were expected at the convention.

==== Controversy ====
Following the 2023 event, Obsessed Fest became the subject of public criticism related to its organization.

Kristin Caruso and Brandi Pond of Let's Go to Court! stated in their podcast following the event that Mischief Management did nothing to make attendees aware of any resolution to an altercation that occurred; as a direct result of the lack of communication, they left the venue early. In addition, they noted that they had been locked out of the room in which they were scheduled to hold their live taping.

Attendee complaints included excessive pricing as well as the perks promised to those who purchased the US$1,200 tier passes not being provided, such as exclusive meet and greet sessions that were supposedly included later requiring a 'claim' be made for a seat but with purchasers unable to complete such claims. There were also complaints that the swag bags did not contain the expected value of items. The bags were described as a "tiny nylon backpack" containing approximately US$3.95 worth of merchandise.

Ticket holders for this tier had been promised an exclusive cocktail party, but were not aware that drinks at the party would be an additional charge, US$11 per cocktail, US$7 per beer. Podcasters present at the party also had to pay for their own refreshments, though Mischief Management provided personnel to "cut line" in front of waiting attendees in order to obtain drinks for the talent. The room was also described as being too small for the attendance.

When mentioning that some attendees complained that podcasters they had wanted to meet at the event weren't present, Flynn and Lavoie of Crime Writers On... noted that neither Toby Ball nor Lara Bricker were invited to either Obsessed Fest event, and in 2023, numerous additional podcasts were added to the roster while omitting Ball and Bricker. Flynn and Lavoie also noted that the podcaster introductions that had been present at Obsessed Fest 2022 were absent from the 2023 event, with Lavoie mentioning that it had been scheduled but was cancelled. The ceremony that did occur only had Hinds and two other podcasters on the stage alongside Hinds' husband, Steve Tipton; the drag queens who would perform at the brunch that Sunday; and the representative from the convention's sole known sponsor, Patreon.

At least one other part of the scheduled programming did not take place at all: the true crime podcasters mega panel, a returning feature from the 2022 event, was cancelled after the 2023 event had begun.

At approximately 1:45 PM on Saturday, attendees overheard Terra Newell and her co-host Collier Landry yelling profanities at Marsh, who hurried away from them, concerned for her safety. Marsh requested staff remove Newell and Landry, which Mischief Management refused to do. Instead, as the producer for I Think Not! was notifying attendees in line for the meet and greet that Marsh and Taranto would not be able to be present, Mischief Management removed him from the premises. Marsh and Taranto wanted to move their meet and greet into the hotel lobby, but the Omni staff were not able to accommodate the crowd size due to fire codes and moved the event outside.

Flynn and Lavoie confirmed Caruso and Pond's account that Mischief Management did not communicate with attendees or with podcasters regarding any handling of the situation, leaving those not involved feeling "confused and unsafe." While Mischief Management did eventually release a statement, Flynn and Lavoie noted that the communication from the company did not accurately reflect the experience at the event, and directly contradicted video of the incident. Flynn and Lavoie also mentioned that Newell and Landry apologized to Marsh and Taranto, eventually resolving the issue without any involvement from Mischief Management.

Attendees had also expressed concern regarding the location of the convention, due to the local politics, especially with respect to abortion access and LGBTQ+ rights. Charities were added to the convention brochure, which attendees felt was a last-minute justification for the locale. Additional issues arose at the drag brunch when Mischief Management placed all wheelchair users in a dark corner at a single table. Further, Newell was seated with Hinds, Pensavalle, and Tipton, giving the impression that they did not condemn Newell and Landry's altercation with Marsh.

After the event, people did request refunds.

=== RomanceCon ===
RomanceCon was an event where authors and readers of romance books could gather. The inaugural event was held September 6–7, 2024 at the Baird Center in Milwaukee, Wisconsin, managed by Mischief Management. It featured over 100 authors and boasted 1,400 attendees. Activities included meetups for multiple subgenres within the romance community, book signings, a craft night, dinner with the authors, a masquerade ball, and a marketplace with both books and book-themed items for sale.

The second RomanceCon took place September 5–6, 2025 at the same venue. In July 2025, more than 200 authors withdrew from the event following safety concerns expressed by LGBTQ+ attendees when Mischief Management announced that Julie Soto would be one of the authors present. The concern stemmed from Soto's novel Rose in Chains which began life as a Harry Potter fan fiction, as well as Mischief Management's continued affiliation with Harry Potter content through EnchantiCon. Although Mischief Management announced that they and Soto had "mutually agreed" she would no longer appear at RomanceCon, Mischief Management withdrew from running the event. Tickets, which cost up to US$375, were non-refundable.

=== EnchantiCon ===
EnchantiCon is the re-branding for LeakyCon, announced at the final gathering for the latter in July 2024. Organizers announced an "official nonprofit" partnership with the Metro Trans Umbrella Group of St. Louis on April 23, 2025. Anelli described EnchantiCon as "a whole new world", stating that the intent behind the event is to give Harry Potter fans a space where they can celebrate their love for the series "without feeling like they were celebrating something that now represented something that was against their values."

The first event was held August 15–17, 2025 at the St. Louis Union Station Hotel in St. Louis, Missouri. Programming initially included panels — some featuring voice actors, costume designers, and game developers; workshops; meet and greet sessions; a cosplay contest; live podcast recordings; and a ball with a Shrek theme. Tabletop role-playing game sessions with varying skill levels were expected to run all day and night. The main stage of the event was expected to feature live performances with improv and music acts. Vendors were to include artisans, visual artists, independent authors, and tabletop game developers. Anelli also stated that they intended to have a "sword-fighting area" at the convention.

Guests originally included around forty authors, as well as other celebrities. Among those originally listed to attend were Hale Appleman, Summer Bishil, A.M. Colwell, Olivia Taylor Dudley, Brittany Hanson, Alex La Bruyere, Nita Lynn Lipan, Stella Maeve, Hannah Rachel, S.L. Rowland, and Bree Wilde.

During the month of July 2025, Mischief Management was forced to alter the schedule, removing panels entirely. They posted an announcement regarding the Harry Potter panels they had included on Instagram, stating that transgender and queer attendees had requested the content's inclusion, and the panels had in fact been expected to be run by that community. Cosplay, crafting, and the gaming night did still all occur, as well as the ball.

The 2026 EnchantiCon was scheduled for July 10–12 at the same venue.

=== Barbie Dream Fest ===
Barbie Dream Fest was a three-day fan convention held from March 27 to 29, 2026, at the Broward County Convention Center in Fort Lauderdale, Florida. Announced on July 21, 2025, the event was produced by Mischief Management under license from Mattel and was marketed as an immersive fan experience featuring interactive exhibits, themed installations, and celebrity appearances. Advertisements had stated that Serena Williams would be present, as well as members of the voice cast from Barbie: Life in the Dreamhouse. Barbie The Movie: In Concert, a world tour featuring the all-woman orchestra Barbie Land Sinfonietta playing the score and soundtrack of the 2023 Barbie film while the movie played on screen, was expected to arrive for a performance on the first night of the festival.

In October 2025, Misfit Toys Communications, the company who issued press releases regarding Barbie Dream Fest, ended its contract with Mischief Management citing "lack of payment and [concerns] that the event was not shaping up to be what was originally described."

Following its opening, the event received widespread criticism from attendees and media outlets, who reported that it did not meet advertised expectations. Attendees described sparse decorations, limited interactive elements, and confusion over additional costs for activities that were not clearly included with admission.

Ticket prices ranged from approximately $69 for single-day admission to more than $400 for premium packages.

Media coverage and attendee reactions circulated widely on social media, with comparisons drawn to other poorly received events such as the Fyre Festival and the Willy Wonka-themed experience in Glasgow; though some expected celebrities were present: Williams, Angel Reese, and Marlee Matlin were all in attendance. After the event began, aerospace engineer Emily Calandrelli cancelled her appearance due to a pregnancy issue, stating she felt uncomfortable traveling to Florida under the circumstances given the state's restrictions on emergency care for pregnant women.

In response to the backlash, Mischief Management initially offered refunds equal to two-thirds of the price for those who had purchased weekend passes. Mattel later announced that full refunds would be issued to all ticket holders, stating that it had licensed the Barbie brand for the event and was working with the organizers to address attendee concerns and process refunds. A statement from Mischief Management e-mailed to USA Today stated that attendees could expect full refunds within three to four weeks.

Vendors who had booths at the event also asked about refunds.

==== Lawsuit ====
Utopia Marketing filed suit against Mischief Management for non-payment of US$8,800 on March 31, 2026 in the county court of Miami-Dade County, Florida.

=== Jewish Joy Con ===
Announced in July 2025, Jewish Joy Con is an upcoming collaboration between Jewish Joy LLC headed by Jean Meltzer and Mischief Management. Originally scheduled for March 13–15, 2026, the event was postponed until spring 2027. The announcement was made on January 16, 2026, via Facebook.

== Revenue ==
In 2016, Mischief Management had a revenue of around US$2,000,000. In 2017, it generated approximately US$3,000,000.

In 2021, businesses were awarded a Shuttered Venue Operators Grant through the U.S. Small Business Administration to aid those having suffered losses due to closures as a result of the COVID-19 pandemic. Mischief Management was granted US$2,230,413.
