= BroadwayCon =

Theater fan convention in New York City

- Status: Active
- Genre: Theater; Broadway theater; Musical theater
- Frequency: Usually annually
- Venue: Varied
- Locations: New York City, New York
- Country: United States
- Years active: 2016–present
- Inaugurated: January 22–24, 2016
- Founders: Melissa Anelli; Stephanie Dornhelm; Anthony Rapp
- Most recent: January 23–25, 2026
- Attendance: 7,000 estimated in 2019
- Major events: Panels, performances, workshops, sing-alongs, fan meetups, autograph and photo sessions, marketplace
- Organizer: Mischief Management
- Website: www.broadwaycon.com

BroadwayCon is a fan convention dedicated to Broadway theater, musical theater and live stage entertainment. The event is held in New York City and is produced by Mischief Management. It was created by Melissa Anelli, Stephanie Dornhelm and actor Anthony Rapp, with Playbill as a presenting partner.

BroadwayCon combines fan-convention programming with theater-industry events, including panels, performances, workshops, sing-alongs, fan meetups, autograph sessions, photo opportunities and a marketplace. It has featured Broadway performers, writers, directors, producers, designers, choreographers, casting directors, musicians and theater journalists, as well as programming for theater fans and people interested in theater careers.

== Origins ==
BroadwayCon grew out of Anelli and Dornhelm's work organizing fan conventions, including LeakyCon and GeekyCon, and Rapp's connection to the fan culture around Rent. Anelli had been a fan of Rent and had seen the show more than 50 times. She met Rapp, who originated the role of Mark Cohen in the musical, outside the Nederlander Theatre during the show's original Broadway run, and later remained connected to him and other fans through online Rent fan communities.

According to The New York Times, Anelli and Dornhelm discussed the possibility of a Broadway-focused fan convention while texting during the Tony Awards and later approached Rapp, who agreed to help develop the event. The Wall Street Journal reported that Rapp's involvement helped connect the organizers to the Broadway community as they planned the first convention. In a 2015 interview with Playbill, Rapp said BroadwayCon was intended as a fan-centered event rather than an industry-directed convention.

== Format and recurring programming ==
BroadwayCon programming has included panels, performances, theater-industry discussions, fan meetups, workshops, autograph and photo sessions, cosplay, games, a marketplace and social events. Recurring or repeated programming has included BroadwayCon First Look, Show Spotlights, the Star To Be talent competition, the Cosplay Contest, BroadwayCon Feud, trivia events, sing-alongs and BroadwayCon Industry Day.

The event has been described as emphasizing direct interaction between theater artists and fans. Before the first convention, The New York Times reported that BroadwayCon did not follow the pay-for-autographs-and-photographs model common at some other fan conventions, and instead emphasized workshops, sing-alongs and panels. In a 2016 recap, Backstage described the inaugural event as a gathering where fans and theater artists collectively celebrated Broadway fandom, while Rapp called it "a celebration and an opportunity for our community to come together".

In addition to show previews and fan events, BroadwayCon programming has addressed topics such as accessibility, diversity and representation, mental health, stage management, theater criticism, marketing, audience development, playwriting and careers in the theater industry.

== History ==
=== 2016 inaugural convention ===
The first BroadwayCon was held January 22–24, 2016, at the New York Hilton Midtown. Before the event, The New York Times described it as a theater-themed variation on Comic-Con International, reflecting the growing visibility of Broadway fan culture online and on social media. The newspaper reported that nearly 80 percent of registrants were female, 75 percent were from outside New York state and 50 percent were age 30 or younger. The Wall Street Journal reported that about 5,000 people attended the convention from around the world, while other outlets reported attendance of nearly 6,000.

The first BroadwayCon coincided with the January 2016 blizzard, which shut down Broadway performances on Saturday, January 23. BroadwayCon continued at the hotel despite the weather, though some scheduled celebrity appearances were canceled because of travel delays. Organizers responded by adding a "Broadway Party Line", in which Rapp, theater columnist Michael Riedel and Playbill editor-in-chief Blake Ross called Broadway figures including Patti LuPone, Joel Grey, Audra McDonald, Betty Buckley and Laura Benanti by speakerphone and FaceTime.

Programming at the inaugural convention included fan meetups, panels, workshops, sing-alongs, a marketplace and MainStage events. A Rent reunion was held for the musical's 20th anniversary, with original cast members and creative team members including Rapp, Adam Pascal, Daphne Rubin-Vega, choreographer Marlies Yearby, conductor Tim Weil and casting director Bernard Telsey participating in a panel titled "10,514,880 Minutes: Measuring 20 Years of Rent".

The convention also included a Hamilton panel featuring Lin-Manuel Miranda, Leslie Odom Jr., Phillipa Soo, Renée Elise Goldsberry, Daveed Diggs, Jonathan Groff and Christopher Jackson. The Wall Street Journal reported that the panel drew more than half of the convention's enrollment. Other 2016 programming included panels or events connected to Fun Home, Waitress, Fiddler on the Roof, The King and I, Something Rotten!, Spring Awakening, The Phantom of the Opera and Les Misérables.

The opening MainStage program included an original musical about the creation of BroadwayCon, with performers including Rob McClure and Ann Harada. NewYorkTheater.me reported that the event featured about 36 hours of programming across three days, including meetups, sing-alongs, panel discussions, signings and celebrity appearances. At the close of the convention, Rapp told attendees that the event would return the following year.

=== 2017 expansion to Javits Center ===
BroadwayCon's second convention was held January 27–29, 2017, at the Jacob K. Javits Convention Center in New York City. After the 2016 event sold out the New York Hilton Midtown, organizers moved the convention to a larger venue, with Reuters reporting that attendance was expected to increase from about 5,000 people in 2016 to as many as 6,000 attendees on each of the three days in 2017. The move also allowed BroadwayCon to expand to two stages, including a 5,000-seat MainStage, along with additional programming rooms, exhibits and marketplace space.

The 2017 convention included panels, performances, interviews, workshops, sing-alongs, autograph and photo sessions, fan meetups, a marketplace, a cabaret and a talent competition. Scheduled guests included Chita Rivera, Joel Grey, Josh Groban, Kelli O'Hara, Cynthia Nixon, Jonathan Groff, Jeremy Jordan, Laura Osnes, Christopher Jackson and Okieriete Onaodowan. Programming highlights included a 20th-anniversary panel for The Lion King with Julie Taymor and Disney Theatrical Group president Thomas Schumacher, a panel for Dear Evan Hansen featuring Ben Platt, Benj Pasek and Justin Paul, and BroadwayCon First Look previews of spring 2017 productions including Amélie, Anastasia, Bandstand, Charlie and the Chocolate Factory, Come from Away, Indecent, Miss Saigon, Significant Other, Sunday in the Park with George and The Play That Goes Wrong.

Fan-centered programming also expanded in 2017. The Wall Street Journal reported that Hamilton fandom was one of the most visible parts of the convention, with a fan meetup becoming a sing-along and attendees appearing in Hamilton-inspired costumes. The convention also introduced the BroadwayCon Star To Be talent competition, which was held on the MainStage and judged by LaChanze, Anthony Rapp and casting director Tara Rubin. Iyana Colby was named the first winner.

==== Actors' Equity dispute ====
One week before the 2017 convention, the Actors' Equity Association placed BroadwayCon on its "do not work" list and instructed members not to perform or rehearse for the event until an agreement was reached. The dispute concerned payment terms for BroadwayCon appearances after the 2016 convention. The New York Times reported that the issue involved about two hours of MainStage performance time and 10 Equity performers.

Melissa Anelli said at the time that BroadwayCon wanted to comply with Equity rules and was seeking a solution, while Rapp said discussions with the union had been positive. In December 2017, BroadwayCon and Actors' Equity reached a three-year agreement that set standard contracts for Equity members and added provisions for shorter convention appearances. Broadway News reported that the agreement increased weekly minimum salaries for actors and stage managers while tailoring parts of the contract to appearances lasting less than an hour.

=== 2018 convention ===
The third BroadwayCon was held January 26–28, 2018, at the Jacob K. Javits Convention Center in New York City. The convention was produced by Mischief Management and again featured panels, performances, interviews, workshops and sing-alongs. The convention was preceded by BroadwayCon Industry Day on January 25, 2018, at the Crowne Plaza Times Square Manhattan. Curated by Situation, the one-day program was designed for theater professionals and focused on Broadway fan engagement, with panels on audience development, technology, fan communities and leadership.

BroadwayCon announced more than 160 hours of original programming for 2018, including fan-led meetups, workshops, Show Spotlights, BroadwayCon First Look and a lottery system for free autograph and photo opportunities. Programming highlights included a 10th-anniversary reunion for In the Heights, Show Spotlights for Dear Evan Hansen, SpongeBob SquarePants, Come from Away, Frozen and The Band's Visit, and BroadwayCon First Look previews of productions including Harry Potter and the Cursed Child, The Prom, Escape to Margaritaville and Children of a Lesser God.

The In the Heights reunion featured Lin-Manuel Miranda, Quiara Alegría Hudes, Christopher Jackson, Karen Olivo, Mandy Gonzalez, Olga Merediz and Javier Muñoz, with Luis Miranda moderating. Other 2018 programming included a Broadway accessibility panel, a cosplay fashion show, the second BroadwayCon Star To Be competition, the BroadwayCon Blizzard Party Line and a program celebrating the work of Lynn Ahrens and Stephen Flaherty.

=== 2019 convention ===
The fourth BroadwayCon was held January 11–13, 2019, at the New York Hilton Midtown, with additional events at the Ziegfeld Ballroom. The convention returned to the Hilton, where the inaugural BroadwayCon had been held in 2016, after two years at the Jacob K. Javits Convention Center. The New York Times reported that the 2019 convention offered nearly 200 hours of sessions and drew an estimated 7,000 attendees over three days.

BroadwayCon Industry Day returned for its second year on January 11, 2019. Curated by Situation Interactive, the industry-focused program was designed for theater professionals and included sessions on fan engagement, digital content, accessibility, marketing, branding, social media, audience loyalty and storytelling.

The 2019 schedule included fan-led meetups, workshops, show spotlights, a cabaret, R&H Goes Pop!, BroadwayCon First Look and free autograph and photograph opportunities distributed through a lottery system. Show-specific programming included sessions for Harry Potter and the Cursed Child, Mean Girls, The Cher Show, The Prom, Be More Chill, Come from Away, Dear Evan Hansen and My Fair Lady. Other programming included Disney Theatrical's 25th-anniversary panel, a 20th-anniversary reunion for You're a Good Man, Charlie Brown, the BroadwayCon Cosplay Contest, BroadwayCon Jukebox, BroadwayCon Blizzard Party Line and the BroadwayCon YouTube Send-Off Party.

BroadwayCon First Look previewed upcoming Broadway productions including Hadestown, Kiss Me, Kate, Tootsie and Beetlejuice. The 2019 BroadwayCon Star To Be competition, held in partnership with the Broadway League Foundation, featured 10 finalist acts; 2018 Jimmy Award winners Andrew Barth Feldman and Reneé Rapp performed during the competition while the judges deliberated.

=== 2020 convention ===
The fifth BroadwayCon was held January 24–26, 2020, at the New York Hilton Midtown. The New York Times reported that more than 5,000 people attended the three-day convention, where fans participated in cosplay, sing-alongs, Playbill trading, marketplace events, autograph and photograph opportunities and show-related programming.

BroadwayCon Industry Day returned for its third consecutive year on January 24, 2020. Curated by Situation Interactive, the half-day program was held on the first day of the convention and focused on the Broadway business, fan engagement, audience development, digital technology, theater criticism, advertising and storytelling.

A schedule preview announced more than 80 hours of original programming, with more than 100 additional hours to be added. The schedule included fan-led meetups, Show Spotlights, BroadwayCon First Look, autograph and photograph lotteries, workshops, interviews, performances and sing-alongs. Major show programming included panels or spotlights for Moulin Rouge!, Harry Potter and the Cursed Child, Beetlejuice, Mrs. Doubtfire, Dear Evan Hansen, Hadestown, Jagged Little Pill and Six.

BroadwayCon First Look previewed upcoming Broadway productions including Girl from the North Country, Six, Company, Mrs. Doubtfire, Caroline, or Change and Sing Street. The New York Times reported that Six, which had not yet begun Broadway previews, had a significant presence at the convention through fan cosplay, a sing-along and a dance workshop led by choreographer Carrie-Anne Ingrouille. The 2020 convention also included BroadwayCon Jukebox, the BroadwayCon Blizzard Party Line, BroadwayCon Feud, Game Night, the Ultimate Trivia Challenge, the Cosplay Contest and the BroadwayCon Star To Be competition, which was won by Luke Islam.

Other programming addressed theater criticism, mental health, body bias, college auditions, directing, choreography, stage management, playwriting and diversity in the theater industry. The New York Amsterdam News highlighted panels on Black LGBTQIA playwrights, Black lead Broadway producers, Black female playwrights and people of color reviewing Broadway.

=== 2021 virtual convention ===
The 2021 BroadwayCon was held online on April 17–18, 2021, during the COVID-19 pandemic and the extended shutdown of Broadway theaters. TheaterMania reported that the virtual event would include two days of panels, programming, meet-and-greets and other online events. MainStage programming streamed for free on select BroadwayCon social media platforms, while paid passes offered bonus content, virtual swag packs and exclusive merchandise.

The fourth annual BroadwayCon Industry Day was held virtually on April 16, 2021, in partnership with Situation. The free program focused on the state of the theater industry after the 2020 shutdown and the future of Broadway and live theater.

Programming for the 2021 convention included panels on making theater during the pandemic, racial justice on Broadway, mental health, stage management, disability inclusion and advocacy for arts workers. Fan-oriented events included BroadwayCon Star To Be, BroadwayCon Feud, Game Night, the BroadwayCon Cabaret, the Cosplay Contest and the BroadwayCon Blizzard Party Line. Broadway On Demand streamed the event, and a portion of BroadwayCon proceeds was designated for community organizations supporting theater professionals affected by theater closures.

=== 2022 return to in-person programming ===
The seventh BroadwayCon was held July 8–10, 2022, at the Manhattan Center and New Yorker Hotel in New York City. The event had originally been scheduled for February 18–20, but was postponed to July because of rising COVID-19 cases. It was BroadwayCon's first in-person convention since the 2020 event, following the virtual 2021 edition. Organizers kept vaccine and mask requirements for the event as part of its COVID-19 safety planning.

The 2022 convention included live performances, panels, Q&As, contests, show spotlights, sing-alongs, meetups and other fan programming. Featured shows included A Strange Loop, POTUS, Chicago, Dear Evan Hansen, Harry Potter and the Cursed Child, Six, Beetlejuice and Disney Princess — The Concert. Scheduled guests and panelists included Andrew Barth Feldman, Anthony Rapp, Jenn Colella, Judy Kuhn, L Morgan Lee, Lesli Margherita, Nik Walker, Sergio Trujillo and Jennifer Ashley Tepper.

Hillary Clinton helped open the convention on July 8 by moderating "Here's to the Ladies", a panel on women in theater held at the Manhattan Center. The panel featured LaChanze, Donna Murphy, Vanessa Williams and Julie White, and drew an audience of about 500 people. The discussion covered women working in theater, motherhood, childcare, women directors, female-led productions and inclusion in the theater industry.

Other 2022 programming addressed topics including Black artists in Broadway history, trans and gender-nonconforming representation, LGBTQ+ inclusion, disability representation, stage management, TikTok and fan engagement, restaging original productions and Broadway flops. The New York Times reported that attendees at the 2022 event included fans dressed as characters from shows such as Wicked and Six, and that the convention again offered opportunities to meet and take photographs with Broadway performers.

=== 2023 convention ===
The eighth BroadwayCon was held July 21–23, 2023, at the New York Marriott Marquis in Times Square. BroadwayWorld reported that the 2023 convention marked BroadwayCon's debut in Times Square. The New York Times described the event as drawing thousands of fans for costume contests, Playbill swaps, performer meet-and-greets and previews of Broadway productions.

BroadwayCon First Look was held on July 21 and featured appearances from Back to the Future, The Shark Is Broken, Little Shop of Horrors, Rock & Roll Man, How to Dance in Ohio, David Blaine Presents Asi Wind's Inner Circle, Titanique and Just for Us. The How to Dance in Ohio appearance was followed by a panel discussion about the musical, which featured seven autistic actors making their Broadway debuts.

Programming at the 2023 convention emphasized diversity, representation and the future of the theater industry. The New York Times highlighted panels on roles for disabled actors, women and nonbinary musical theater writers, global majority playwrights and musical theater writers, revisions to older revivals, Asian American and Pacific Islander stories and Latino theater. The Dramatists Guild of America presented panels and workshops on women and nonbinary musical theater writers, global majority writers, writer compensation, artist self-advocacy, songwriting, playwriting and artivism.

Additional programming included panels or events related to Fat Ham, KPOP, Ain't No Mo', The Who's Tommy, drag and LGBTQ+ rights, nontraditional casting, autism and mental health. The event also included a Marketplace, cosplay, show-tune sing-alongs and Broadway-related merchandise vendors. Broadway Podcast Network presented live podcast programming during the convention, with guests including Danny Burstein, James Monroe Iglehart, Lilli Cooper, Grey Henson, L Morgan Lee, Jelani Alladin, Marla Mindelle and Sandy Rustin.

A special event, Ozdust Ballroom, was presented by Wicked and BroadwayCon on July 22. The event included Broadway show tunes, Wicked music, live performances, giveaways and photo opportunities.

==== Venue contract dispute ====
In October 2025, the Supreme Court of the State of New York, New York County, issued a decision in a contract dispute involving the 2023 BroadwayCon event at the New York Marriott Marquis. Marriott International, as manager of the hotel, alleged that Mischief Management owed $27,861.53 under a contract for BroadwayCon to be held there from July 20 to July 22, 2023. The court dismissed Marriott's motion for a default judgment without prejudice, finding that Marriott had not provided sufficient proof that an additional mailing requirement for service had been met.

=== 2024 convention ===
The ninth BroadwayCon was held July 26–28, 2024, at the New York Hilton Midtown. The New York Times reported that the event would draw thousands of theater fans and that one focus of the convention was mental health in the theater industry.

Mental health and accessibility programming included panels and events on sobriety, self-care, body image, eating disorders, autism and accessibility for autistic theatergoers and artists. Featured discussions included "Musicals & Mental Health", with Hannah Cruz, Mary Testa, Alton Fitzgerald White and Max Crumm; "Sober in the City", with Sean Daniels, Elizabeth Addison and Gregory Treco; and "Nothing About Us Without Us", with autistic performing arts professionals including Conor Tague, Desmond Luis Edwards and Madison Kopec of How to Dance in Ohio.

A schedule preview announced nearly 80 hours of original programming, including fan-led meetups, Show Spotlights, BroadwayCon First Look and Showcase, autograph and selfie experiences, workshops and other fan events. First Look and Showcase featured performances from Suffs, The Outsiders, A Wonderful World: The Louis Armstrong Musical, Gun & Powder, The Notebook, Six, & Juliet and The Book of Mormon.

Other 2024 programming included panels or events related to The Wiz, Purlie Victorious, Six, The Outsiders, Broadway understudies and alternates, stage combat, theater photography, Foley effects, film and television careers and business and marketing strategy for performers. The convention also included the Marketplace, autograph signings, dance classes, Star To Be, BroadwayCon Game Show, Ultimate Trivia Challenge, Broadway Feud and the Cosplay Contest.

A Disney on Broadway 30th anniversary sing-along was held on July 27, with James Monroe Iglehart, Kara Lindsay, Patti Murin and Josh Strickland. At the end of the convention, organizers announced that the 10th anniversary BroadwayCon would return to a winter schedule and be held February 7–9, 2025.

=== 2025 10th anniversary convention ===
The 10th BroadwayCon was held February 7–9, 2025, at the New York Marriott Marquis in Times Square. The event had originally been scheduled for the New York Hilton Midtown, but organizers announced shortly before the convention that it would move to the Marriott Marquis.

A December 2024 schedule preview announced nearly 100 hours of original programming, including fan-led sing-alongs, Show Spotlights, BroadwayCon First Look performances, Star To Be and the Cosplay Contest. Coverage of the event described programming across multiple floors, including performances, panel discussions, interviews, dance lessons, book signings, sing-alongs, autograph and selfie sessions and a Marketplace.

BroadwayCon First Look featured performances from Redwood, Real Women Have Curves, Music City, A Wonderful World: The Louis Armstrong Musical, Six, Saw, Titanique and & Juliet. Other show-related events included BroadwayCon Nights and talkbacks at The Great Gatsby, & Juliet and A Wonderful World, a Six showcase and dance tutorial, dance tutorials from Drag: The Musical and Chicago and a First Look performance from Music City.

The 10th anniversary convention included "Creatively All In", a panel with Lin-Manuel Miranda; "Writing Wicked", with Gregory Maguire and Winnie Holzman; "Hats Off to Seussical: A 25-Year Reunion", with Ahrens, Flaherty, Kevin Chamberlin, Janine LaManna and Michele Pawk; and "Gone Too Soon", a discussion with actors and creatives from Tammy Faye, Swept Away and Lempicka. Other panels addressed Latin American and Latinx theater voices, the history of the American musical, Hamilton, Our Town, Broadway book writing, regional theater, political themes onstage, stage-to-screen careers, immersive theater and theater for young audiences.

The event also included BroadwayCon Feud, BroadwayCon Game Night, trivia sessions, fan meetups, the Star To Be competition and the Cosplay Contest. Additional guests and participants included Joe Iconis, J. Harrison Ghee, Anthony Rapp, Jenn Colella, Lesli Margherita, David Henry Hwang, David Lindsay-Abaire, John Weidman, Robert L. Freedman and Holzman.

=== 2026 convention ===
The 2026 BroadwayCon was held January 23–25, 2026, in Times Square, with mainstage programming at Palladium Times Square and additional programming and the Marketplace at The New York Westin at Times Square. Each day's programming ran from 9 a.m. to 5:30 p.m. and included panels, performances, interviews, workshops and sing-alongs.

The convention included the first BroadwayCon Drag Ball, held on January 24, with drag performances, photo opportunities and dancing. BroadwayCon also raised funds for Broadway Cares/Equity Fights AIDS during the event.

Major programming included "Time Flies: The 30 Year RENT Reunion", a panel celebrating the 30th anniversary of Rent, with Rapp, Adam Pascal, Idina Menzel, Jesse L. Martin, Fredi Walker-Browne, Giles Chiasson, Tim Weil and others. The convention also included appearances from Operation Mincemeat, Masquerade, Two Strangers (Carry a Cake Across New York) and Six.

Other announced programming included an Asian American, Native Hawaiian and Pacific Islander song celebration, a Marc Shaiman conversation, a theater criticism panel moderated by Mo Rocca, a Susan Stroman creative-process panel, a Cats: The Jellicle Ball sing-along, a Jeffrey Seller conversation, a Sunday in the Park with George reunion and panels about Broadway affordability, Wicked fandom, the history of the Broadway musical, theater writing and The Phantom of the Opera.

Recap coverage of the convention described a First Look Showcase that included Operation Mincemeat, The Lost Boys and Music City, as well as a First Look Masquerade, the TDF Costume Exhibit in the Marketplace and a puppetry session. Additional recap coverage noted panels or events featuring Stroman, Shaiman, Scott Wittman, Kerry Butler, Seller, Rapp, Pascal, Rob Morrison, Jennifer Barnhart, Rick Lyon, Mandy Gonzalez and Christopher Jackson.
