= PotterCast =

American podcast about Harry Potter

- Genre: Harry Potter

Cast and voices
- Hosted by: Melissa Anelli; John Noe; Frankie "Frak" Franco III

Publication
- Original release: August 22, 2005
- Updates: Infrequent

Reception
- Ratings: 4.2/5

Related
- Website: http://www.pottercast.com/

PotterCast is the official podcast of the Harry Potter fansite The Leaky Cauldron. Its episodes are posted once per month and are typically about an hour long. In every episode, the hosts discuss particular passages, themes, and questions from the Harry Potter books and films, and they go over the Potter-related news stories reported during the previous week by The Leaky Cauldron. The podcast often includes input from everyday Potter fans, but it has also featured numerous interviews with professionals involved in making the Potter books, films, and video games. PotterCast frequently hosts contests, and it has presented a variety of themed shows, including a special wizard rock video edition and an episode for Banned Books Week 2005, in which staff interviewed representatives from the American Library Association. It also covers breaking news, such as the press conference hosted by Warner Brothers before the release of Harry Potter and the Goblet of Fire.

PotterCast was launched on August 22, 2005, and with episode 130 it became the first podcast to interview Harry Potter author J.K. Rowling.

== Segments ==
=== Current regular segments ===
- Intro: A pre-recorded introduction of the show and its hosts by J. K. Rowling has been used since her appearance in episode 130. Previously, the introduction was recorded by Rupert Grint (episodes 112-129) and Matthew Lewis (for a few episodes prior to the release of Harry Potter and the Deathly Hallows).
- News: Led by rotating hosts. Replaced the Leaky Lowdown/Newswrap in September 2007, combining them into one segment relating and discussing the past week's Potter-related news updates. Formerly hosted by Sue Upton, but had a changed title due to Sue leaving the show in late 2009 (episode 211).
- Bit by Bit: Premiered in October 2007. In this segment, the hosts discuss Deathly Hallows a small piece at a time (usually less than a chapter each week), progressing through the book.
- Wrap-up: The hosts conclude the show, tie off loose ends, announce upcoming events or issue calls to listeners to send videos, voice-mails or other responses related to a given topic. Traditionally takes place over the background music of "The Drums" (actually popular jazz tune, "Sing Sing Sing." Starting with episode 204, it was replaced with the similar "Wizard Wheezes" by Nicholas Hooper from Harry Potter and the Half-Blood Prince).
- Bloopers: An occasional short segment played after the close of the show, featuring an outtake from the episode's recording.
- Quick Fire Canon Conclundrums: An on-and-off segment in which the hosts discuss canon related topics.

=== Irregular segments ===
- PotterCast Acting Troupe: A segment that will span multiple episodes, featuring voice actors performing a radio play written by a fanfiction author from "The Sugar Quill." The story focuses on the next generation of Hogwarts students, including Harry Potter's children in a story called, "Albus Potter and the Founder's Fountain".
- Fan Thoughts: Premiered in October 2007. Voice messages from listeners with thoughts about the current or previous week's topics of discussion.
- Fan Interview ("In the Fan Corner"): An interview with a fan who has an interesting or unusual perspective on the series, often having used the books as personal inspiration (such as for art or music) or to inspire others (such as in the classroom or in their community).
- In the Know: An interview with an individual who has not been involved in creating the Potter books or films, but has expertise in these or related industries.
- Extendable Ears: Interviews with filmmakers, editors, actors, etc. who have been directly involved with the Harry Potter franchise.
- Mailbag: A segment where the PotterCast hosts aired and responded to voicemails from listeners. This segment appeared to have been replaced with "Fan Thoughts" in October 2007, but was re-introduced in April 2008 (episode 149) to discuss the Warner Bros. and JK Rowling vs. RDR Books trial and its media coverage.
- Potter Pundits: A segment where more intellectual discussion is held. Hosted by university professors, authors, etc.
- Are YOU Smarter Than John Noe?: Premiered in episode 140. A game where listeners call in to compete with John by answering Harry Potter trivia questions, based on the TV show Are You Smarter Than a 5th Grader?. In one episode it was determined that a voicemail was in fact smarter than John.
- Canon Conundrums: Premiered in April 2006. The hosts tackle an unanswered question from the Harry Potter series, such as "How does the Fidelius Charm work?". Steve Vander Ark of the Harry Potter Lexicon cohosted these segments until his site and The Leaky Cauldron dropped their association. Since the release of Deathly Hallows, the hosts have renamed this segment Canon Conclundrums, using 'conclundrums' as a portmanteau of 'conclusions' and 'conundrums'.

=== Retired segments ===
- Leaky Lowdown/Newswrap: Analysis and discussion of the latest Potter-related news. Replaced in September 2007 with "Sue's News."
- Phoenix Files: Similar to "Bit by Bit," discussion of the film Harry Potter and the Order of the Phoenix a few minutes at a time. Premiered in August 2007 and concluded in summer 2008.
- Modcast: In-depth discussion of one character or theme from the Harry Potter books hosted by the moderators on The Leaky Cauldron's forums. Discontinued in August 2006.
- Princely Pieces: In this segment, the hosts discussed the sixth movie.
- Scribby 5 - Premiered in March 2007. A five-minute discussion of a recent essay submitted to the Leaky Cauldron's essay project, Scribbulus. It was hosted by Scribbulus editors Melissa Wall, Sloan de Forest, and Nina de Boo.

== Hosts ==
- Melissa Anelli, webmaster of The Leaky Cauldron.
- John Noe, creative director for The Leaky Cauldron.
- Frankie "Frak" Franco III, artist for The Leaky Cauldron – Began as guest host while John finished school; became a permanent host in episode 144.

Other staff participants include audio editors, transcription "elves," Scribbulus editors, and moderators from The Leaky Cauldron's forum, the Leaky Lounge.

=== Former hosts ===
- Sue Upton, senior news editor for The Leaky Cauldron (left after episode 211 after Upton resigned from The Leaky Cauldron website duties)

== Notable interviews/appearances ==
- Notable members of Harry Potter publishing
  - J.K. Rowling (episodes 130 and 131)
  - Arthur A. Levine – Editor of the American editions of the Harry Potter books and the person widely credited with bringing Potter to America. (episodes 22–24)
  - Cheryl Klein – Continuity editor of the American editions of the Harry Potter books. (episode 47)
- Cast of the Harry Potter film series
  - Matthew Lewis – Actor who plays Neville Longbottom. (episode 51–53)
  - Rupert Grint – Actor who plays Ron Weasley. Voiced the intro for episodes 112–129.
  - Jamie Waylett – Actor who plays Vincent Crabbe. (episode 31)
  - Bonnie Wright – Actress who plays Ginny Weasley.
  - Evanna Lynch – Actress who plays Luna Lovegood. (episode 69)
  - Chris Rankin – Actor who plays Percy Weasley.
- Crew members of the Harry Potter film series
  - Chris Columbus – Director of the first two Potter films.
  - Alfonso Cuarón – Director of the third Potter film.
  - Mike Newell – Director of the fourth Potter film.
  - Stuart Craig – Art director on all Potter films.
- Miscellaneous appearances
  - M. Night Shyamalan (episode 48)
  - Matt Birch and Justin Manning – Producers for the Order of the Phoenix computer game from EA Games.
  - Danny Bilson – Producer, writer, and director. Worked on the initial creation of the Harry Potter video games.
  - Laura Mallory – Georgia woman attempting to ban Potter books from school libraries for religious reasons. (episode 119)
  - Duff Goldman – Owner of Charm City Cakes, who created a cake for the LA premiere of Order of the Phoenix.
  - John and Hank Green – The Vlogbrothers on YouTube
  - Neil Cicierega – Creator of the Potter Puppet Pals
  - Nick Lang, Brian Holden, and Darren Criss – Creators of A Very Potter Musical.

== Audience ==
The show has spawned several fan groups – SQUEE (Sue's Quite Unnervingly Excitable Enthusiasts), The John Noe Fan Club, MAFIA (Melissa Anelli's Fans In Action), Guru's Fans, and PCAA (PotterCast Addicts Anonymous). It has also inspired the creation of a few wizard rock bands, including Sue and the Hufflepuffs, Melissa and the Anellis, and MC Dawlish. Listeners frequently create elaborate videos and filks for PotterCast contests and fan challenges.

== Awards ==
- iTunes Best of 2007 Podcasts – In the "Classics: Audio" category.
- 2007 Parsec Awards – Nominee for Best (Speculative Fiction) News Podcast, Best Audio Production, and Best Fan Podcast.
- 2006 Parsec Awards – Nominee for Best Fan Podcast
- 2006 Podcast Awards – Winner of Best Entertainment Podcast
- 2006 Podcast Awards – Nominee for Podcast of the Year (People's Choice)
- iTunes – Around August 24, 2005 it was ranked as iTunes #1 podcast. Ranked #13 when the interviews with J.K. Rowling were released (PotterCast episodes 130–131).

== See also ==
- Harry Potter fandom
