= The Leaky Cauldron =

The Leaky Cauldron may refer to:

- The Leaky Cauldron (pub), a fictional pub in Harry Potter
- The Leaky Cauldron (website), a Harry Potter fan site named after the pub
