= Marvin S. Putnam =

American lawyer

Marvin S. Putnam is an American trial lawyer. He is a partner at Latham & Watkins, and serves as global chair of the firm's Entertainment, Sports & Media Industry Group. In 2018, Putnam received the Distinguished Leadership award from PEN America. He is known for representing celebrities including Beyoncé, Tom Brady, and Larry David, as well as entities including AEG and Netflix.

== Early life and education ==
Putnam grew up in Maine. He graduated from Phillips Exeter Academy and Harvard. Putnam earned a J.D. from Georgetown University Law Center in 1993.

== Career ==
Putnam began his career working as a law clerk for Judge Roger Andewelt in the United States Court of Federal Claims. He later joined Cahill Gordon & Reindel in New York where he worked on First Amendment cases under attorney Floyd Abrams. Putnam later joined the firm O'Melveny & Myers, where he represented clients in the entertainment industry including Siegfried & Roy and J. K. Rowling. In 2015, Putman joined the firm Latham & Watkins, joining the firm as a partner in the litigation department.

=== Notable cases ===
In 2009, Putnam represented Crusader Entertainment when it successfully sued author Clive Cussler for breach of contract. The production company alleged that Cussler inflated sales numbers of his novel Sahara, which the company adapted into a film that fared poorly at the box office.

Putnam represented J.K. Rowling in 2008 when the author successfully sued to block publication of The Harry Potter Lexicon, an encyclopedia written by a fan of her work.

In 2012, Putnam was the lead attorney for the trial of AEG Live, the promoter of what was supposed to be Michael Jackson's comeback tour; Jackson died days before the 2009 opening date. Putnam defended the company and its senior leadership in the six-month wrongful death trial brought by Jackson's mother Katherine Jackson and his three children; the family alleged that AEG was responsible for hiring Conrad Murray, the physician who administered a fatal dose of anesthesia to Jackson in 2009, causing his death. Putnam argued that AEG was not responsible for hiring Murray, and that Jackson had a history of doctor shopping and propofol use; in 2013 a jury ruled unanimously in AEG's favor, noted by The Hollywood Reporter as one of Hollywood's Top 10 Legal Disputes of 2013.

Putnam represented Miramax and former board member of The Weinstein Company Tim Sarnoff in connected to the Harvey Weinstein sexual abuse cases.

In 2023, Putnam represented Tom Brady, Gisele Bündchen, and Larry David in class action lawsuits brought against them for their promotion of the cryptocurrency exchange FTX, which went bankrupt in 2022.

In 2024, Putnam was hired by Netflix for its defense of the Baby Reindeer defamation lawsuit filed in California Federal Court by Fiona Harvey, who sued Netflix for $170 million, claiming that the show "viciously destroyed" her.

== Awards and honors ==
In 2014, Putnam was recognized as The National Law Journal's Winning Trial Lawyers, and received the Trial Lawyer of the Year Award from the Century City Bar Association.

In 2018, Putnam received the Distinguished Leadership award from PEN America for supporting the organization in its work to support free expression and literary merit.

Putnam was named by The Hollywood Reporter as one of Hollywood's “Top 100 Attorneys” in 2020, 2021, and 2023.

Putnam was named to Variety's Legal Impact Report every year from 2017 to 2024.

== Personal life ==
Putnam is married to Keri Putnam, a film executive.
