= Keri Putnam =

American film executive

- Born: 1965 (age 60–61)
- Education: Harvard University
- Occupations: Film executive and producer

Keri Putnam (born 1965) is an American film, media and arts executive and producer was the executive director at Sundance Institute. She is a former executive vice president at HBO Films, and former president of the production at Miramax films.

== Background ==
=== Education and early career ===
Putnam graduated from Princeton Day School in 1983. She graduated summa cum laude from Harvard University and holds a bachelor's degree in both theatre history and literature, class of 1987. She began her career working in the literary office of regional theaters, including Williamstown Theater Festival, McCarter Theatre, Arena Stage and the ART.

=== HBO ===
In 1987, Putnam joined HBO as an assistant in original programming and served as HBO New York City Productions Vice President from 1996 to 1999 and as the executive vice president from 2002 to 2006. During her tenure at HBO, she oversaw 48 award-winning films and mini-series including If These Walls Could Talk, Mi Vida Loca, Empire Falls, Lackawanna Blues and Normal. The projects she supervised collectively received 50 Emmy awards and nominations, as well as numerous other honors such as Peabody and Golden Globes Awards.

In 2005, she was the senior HBO production executive involved in the formation of Picturehouse, a joint venture between Time Warner subsidiaries, New Line Cinema and HBO Films to acquire and distribute films such as Elephant, a Gus van Sant film that received the Palme d'Or at the 56th Cannes Film Festival.

=== Miramax Films ===
In 2006, Putnam joined Miramax, then a division of Walt Disney Pictures after the departure of the Weinstein brothers from the company, as President of Production. She oversaw the production and acquisition of 20 films including No Country for Old Men, There Will Be Blood, Gone Baby Gone, The Queen, Adventureland and Diving Bell and the Butterfly. She left the company when it was shut down before being sold by Disney.

=== Sundance ===
In February 2010, she was appointed as executive director of Sundance Institute's, the nonprofit arts organization founded by Robert Redford. In this role, she oversees the Sundance Film Festival as well as the institute's many year-round programs to support independent storytelling artists around the world through labs, workshops, and educational resources.

Putnam and Cathy Schulman co-founded ReFrame in 2017, a non-profit organization aimed to support women in the media industry.

Keri Putnam was appointed an Andrew Dickson White Professor-at-Large at Cornell University from 2018 to 2024.

== Personal life ==
Putnam is married to lawyer Marvin S. Putnam.
