= Murder of Jaime Melgar =

2012 murder in Texas

- Location: Houston, Texas, U.S.
- Date: December 23, 2012; 13 years ago
- Attack type: Homicide by blunt trauma and multiple stab wounds
- Victim: Jaime Estuardo Melgar
- Perpetrator: Sandra Jean Melgar
- Motive: Unknown
- Verdict: Guilty
- Convictions: First-degree murder
- Sentence: 27 years in prison

On December 23, 2012, Jaime Estuardo Melgar (born August 10, 1960) was found bound and stabbed to death in his home in Houston, Texas. His wife, Sandra Jean Melgar (née McCulloch; 1959), was also found bound but alive in the house. She was eventually charged and convicted for his murder.

Sandra's conviction drew scrutiny due to the lack of a clear motive or physical evidence in the case. The Innocence Project of Texas later took up her case.

== Background ==
Jaime and Sandra met at Lamar High School and married on December 12, 1980. Jaime pursued a career as an IT specialist while Sandra became a nurse. They joined Jehovah's Witnesses and had a daughter, Elizabeth (born 1987/1988).

Sandra suffered from lupus, epilepsy, hypothyroidism, and had hip replacements. Family friends reported that they had noticed Jaime becoming Sandra's caretaker over the years.

== Timeline ==
=== December 22 ===
Sandra recalled that she and Jaime ate at a restaurant on the evening of December 22 to celebrate their 32nd wedding anniversary. They then stopped at a local CVS to buy drinks, after which she recalled a mysterious car tailing them on their way home, but it had turned a different direction at some point. They continued the celebration in their Jacuzzi. Sandra said they later heard their dogs barking in the backyard, so Jaime went to let them in. Sandra noted that Jaime was taking a long time, and thus went to her closet to get changed. She reported that her next memory was waking up bound in the closet.

=== December 23 ===
On December 23, Jaime's brother Herman and his family arrived at the Melgars' home at 4:30 pm for a planned dinner. When their door knocks got no response, Herman noticed the garage door was partially open and used it to go into the house to unlock the front door for his family. They called for Jaime and Sandra, but got no response.

Herman then heard Sandra's calls for help, and rushed to the master bathroom, where he found a chair blocking the door. After moving it and opening the door, he found Sandra inside, bruised on her arms and with her arms and legs tied up. He struggled to untie her, eventually cutting her loose with a pair of scissors.

Jaime was then found nude with his feet bound with a telephone cord, and stabbed to death in a closet in the master bedroom less than 20 feet away from where Sandra was found. When paramedics arrived, they reported that Sandra "remained in a state of shock and had periods of crying" and "had no sense of time".

== Investigation ==
Jaime was found to have sustained a fractured skull and 50 total stab and blunt force wounds, including 31 stab wounds to his hands and chest; a medical examiner determined that they were all defensive wounds.

Police noted that Sandra had bruises and cuts on her arms and hands, but no blood. She was interrogated by detectives Shawn Carrizal and James Dousay for three hours afterwards. She gave conflicting accounts on being able to hear the dogs barking over the Jacuzzi's tub jets but not being able to hear Jaime being murdered. They became suspicious of her due to her foggy memory, furtive demeanor, and lack of emotion. Her doctor later testified that she had sustained a head injury, which she mistook for a seizure.

Drawers in the bedroom appeared ransacked, with items strewn across the floor and no sign that anyone had cleaned up in the house. A white blouse and a chef's knife later determined to be the murder weapon was found in the Jacuzzi, but chemical processing showed that there was no indication that Sandra had attempted to clean the sinks, shower, or Jacuzzi, nor was there evidence of blood transfer associated with removing bloody clothing or gloves. Investigators found DNA in the house on drawers and door handles that did not match anyone in the Melgar family and instead belonged to an unknown male and female.

Two days after the murder, Elizabeth informed police that various household items, including a TV and some of Sandra's medicine bottles, had gone missing. She also stated that she found a strange backpack in the garage that did not belong to them, containing a gaming system and jewels from the household. The police did not follow up on this matter.

== Legal proceedings ==
In July 2014, Sandra was indicted for Jaime's murder, with the case going to trial in August 2017. The prosecution, led by Colleen Barnett, argued that Sandra had premeditated the murder, luring Jaime to their bedroom before stabbing him to death and staging the scene to resemble a home invasion. Among her proposed motives were a $250,000 life insurance policy and the idea that Sandra wanted a divorce, which would have been prohibited by her faith. She argued that there were no signs of forced entry, and that Sandra had not reported any seizures to her doctor for several years prior to Jaime's murder. Sandra was represented by George "Mac" Secrest. He argued that detectives were biased, highlighting her diminutive size and the lack of physical evidence linking her to the murder. He suggested that the Melgars were the victims of a burglary gone wrong.

The trial lasted for 13 days, ending with Sandra being convicted for Jaime's murder after eight hours of jury deliberation. She was sentenced to 27 years in prison by the jury, which in Texas is responsible for determining the sentence length in most criminal cases. She was initially imprisoned at William P. Hobby Unit near Marlin, Texas before being moved to Carole Young Medical Facility in Dickinson, Texas due to her medical issues. She is eligible for parole in February 2031.

== Aftermath ==
In June 2021, Sandra appealed her conviction on the basis of insufficient evidence, but her appeal was denied by the Texas Court of Criminal Appeals. Elizabeth has maintained her mother's innocence.

The case attracted the attention of podcaster Bob Ruff and wrongful conviction attorney Kathleen Zellner, both of whom have scrutinized Sandra's conviction, highlighting her smaller size and medical issues, as well as the lack of a clear motive and physical evidence, created reasonable doubt as to her guilt.
