= The Leaky Cauldron (website) =

Fan website and blog about Harry Potter

- Screenshot Main page
- Company type: Private company Limited liability company
- Website type: Harry Potter
- Available in: English (U.S.)
- Headquarters: New York, USA
- Owners: Leaky Net, LLC (New York)
- Key people: Melissa Anelli
- Website: www.the-leaky-cauldron.org
- Commercial: Yes
- Registration: Optional
- Launched: 5 July 2000; 26 years ago

The Leaky Cauldron, also called Leaky, TLC, or Leaky News, is a Harry Potter fansite and blog. The site features news, image and video galleries, downloadable widgets, a chat room and discussion forum, and an essay project called Scribbulus, among other offerings. Since 2005, the Leaky Cauldron has also hosted an official podcast, called PotterCast.

The current webmaster of The Leaky Cauldron is Melissa Anelli, a former journalist for the Staten Island Advance and author of the 2008 bestseller Harry, A History. The site's creative director is John Noe. The Leaky Internet business is currently incorporated as the for-profit Leaky Net Inc. (to be distinguished from the non-profit arm, Leaky, Inc.).

== Early history ==
The Leaky Cauldron website was started by Kevin C. Murphy on 5 July 2000, as a GeoCities site managed through Blogger. It moved to its own domain on 4 December 2000. with B.K. DeLong taking control a year later in 2001. Melissa Anelli joined the Leaky staff later that year as an editor and became Managing Editor in 2002. Anelli took full editorial control of the site in 2004. On 28 January 2005, Leaky debuted the Leaky Lounge, a forum for Harry Potter discussion. The forum had over 120,000 registered members. As of late 2013, the forum appeared to have been shut down.

The Leaky Cauldron was also part of the "Floo Network", a collection of Harry Potter sites that also included The Harry Potter Lexicon. The Leaky Cauldron withdrew financial support from the Lexicon and disbanded the Floo Network in 2007 following the legal action pursued by JK Rowling against its creator and webmaster, Steve Vander Ark.

=== April Fools' Day jokes ===
The site is also known for the April Fools' Day jokes that it pulls annually.

In 2003, Leaky posted a copy of 93 words allegedly emailed to the site, in reference to a 93-word card auctioned off the previous December with information about the plot of the upcoming fifth Potter book.

In 2004, actor Jim Tavaré, who would appear later that year in the film Harry Potter and the Prisoner of Azkaban as Tom the Barman, attempted to oust the "Muggles" from the site.

In 2005, the site closed down, posting a note about how tired the webmasters were of handling the foolish questions sent to them by readers each day. As a replacement, the site opened "Ask Peeves", a spoof on the Ask Jeeves search engine.

In 2006, both the Leaky Cauldron and fellow Potter fansite MuggleNet shut down and redirected visitors to a new site, the Leaky Mug. The Leaky Mug's first announcement was the marriage of Leaky webmaster Melissa Anelli to MuggleNet webmaster Emerson Spartz. The two claimed to have merged their sites in the same way they had merged their lives. The next day, both sites were running normally; J. K. Rowling discussed the joke later on her official website.

In 2007, Leaky posted a news item that said it would be closing its doors following the upcoming publication of the final Harry Potter book, Harry Potter and the Deathly Hallows.

In 2008, the Leaky Cauldron announced that Sybill Trelawney, a Hogwarts professor of divination in the Potter series, would be joining the site's staff as a news editor. Leaky also announced that Potter actor Daniel Radcliffe would be eschewing his famous nude scenes in the upcoming Broadway debut of his play Equus and that the wizard rock band Harry and the Potters was disbanding.

In 2009, the site automatically redirected to another website, Hooter, a play on Twitter.

In 2010, the Leaky Cauldron announced it was planning a convention for the popular Fox TV show Glee called "GleekyCon" which would include Cheerios seminars and slushy-making contests.

== Projects ==
=== PotterCast ===
PotterCast is the Leaky Cauldron's official podcast. Launched on 22 August 2005, PotterCast is an hour-long podcast hosted by Anelli, Noe, and Frankie "Frak" Franco III. The podcast includes news updates, discussion of the Potter books and films, interviews with people associated with the Potter franchise (including J. K. Rowling), and other features.

=== LeakyNews.com ===
Leaky bought leakynews.com on 20 November 2005 to make their URL shorter and make access to their site easier. In October 2011, LeakyNews split from the main site to form a new entertainment website disconnected from the Harry Potter franchise, the new website allowed members to write and contribute their own articles on an area of popular culture they enjoyed. The website was renamed Geeky News in 2014, until regular publishing stopped after 2016 and the site itself went offline in 2019.

=== Relationship with the franchise ===
Harry Potter creator J. K. Rowling has praised The Leaky Cauldron on several occasions. On her site, Rowling has said that she visits The Leaky Cauldron and sometimes reads the comments left by visitors, although Rowling does not leave comments there herself; she once wished a reader happy birthday based upon their postings on The Leaky Cauldron. Rowling gave her approval and endorsement to the strong anti-spoiler campaign enforced on Leaky and its forum, the "Leaky Lounge," prior to the release of Harry Potter and the Deathly Hallows.

The Leaky Cauldron and MuggleNet were granted an interview with Rowling at her home in Edinburgh, Scotland in mid-2005, immediately following the release of the sixth Harry Potter novel, Harry Potter and the Half-Blood Prince. In January 2008, Rowling appeared and was interviewed on PotterCast; during the interview, she called Leaky "[her] favorite fan site." Rowling has written the introduction to Melissa Anelli's nonfiction book Harry, A History: The True Story of a Boy Wizard, His Fans, and Life Inside the Harry Potter Phenomenon, which was released 4 November 2008.

The site also has a good relationship with Warner Bros., the studio producing the film adaptations of the Potter books. The studio regularly sent Leaky images from upcoming films before their official release, and gave Leaky a special preview of redesigns of the official Harry Potter website before the releases of the third and fourth films. Leaky was the sole fansite invited to the press junket for the second Potter film, Harry Potter and the Chamber of Secrets; the junkets for later films were opened to additional sites. The website has also received information from other sources in the Harry Potter world, including Arthur A. Levine Books and Bloomsbury Publishing.

In July 2020, The Leaky Cauldron, together with MuggleNet, took several steps to distance themselves from Rowling due to her alleged transphobic statements the previous month. In a joint statement the sites wrote that her views were "out of step with the message of acceptance and empowerment we find in her books and celebrated by the Harry Potter community." They announced that they would no longer use photos of the author, provide links to her website, or write about achievements unrelated to the Potterverse.

== Charitable initiatives ==
The Leaky Cauldron regularly raises funds to aid world literacy, an initiative begun in 2002 with the auction of a card, handwritten by Rowling, with 93 words regarding the plot of the upcoming fifth Harry Potter book. Leaky gathered funds from its readers to place a collective bid, but when their bid was unsuccessful, the money raised was donated to the charity benefiting from the auction. Subsequently, Leaky held a charity drive for several holiday seasons and raised more than $30,000 in donations to date.

The Leaky Cauldron also participated in the fundraiser "Helping Haiti Heal", which was organized by the Harry Potter Alliance. This fundraiser had the goal of raising money for Haiti after the earthquake that struck in January 2010. In the end, Helping Haiti Heal raised $123,000. This money was used to charter five planes to Haiti, nicknamed "Harry", "Hermione", "Ron", "DFTBA" and "Dumbledore", and carried up to 100,000 pounds of critical, life-saving supplies for thousands of Haitians.

=== LeakyCon ===
The first LeakyCon was held in Boston, Massachusetts, 21–24 May 2009 at the Park Plaza Hilton, with an attendance of 750. The second convention took place in Orlando, Florida at Loews Royal Pacific Resort from 13–17 July 2011, with an attendance of 3,400. In addition to panels being broadcast over SiriusXM from 15–18 July, LeakyCon attendees were able to tour The Wizarding World of Harry Potter after park hours overnight 13 July.

The third LeakyCon took place 9–12 August 2012 at the Hilton Chicago, with an attendance of 3,800. Two conventions were held in 2013: Portland, Oregon, from 27–30 June, at the Oregon Convention Center with an attendance of 5,000; and London, England, from 8–11 August, at the Grand Connaught Rooms with an attendance limited to 1,500.

LeakyCon returned to Orlando for 30 July to 3 August 2014, this time held at the Orange County Convention Center, with another after hours event at Universal Orlando. Approximately 1,500 attendees had tickets for the special event; total attendance at the convention was estimated as surpassing 5,000. At the close of the convention, Anelli announced that the existing LeakyCon, as a multiple fandom convention, would be rebranded as GeekyCon, with the LeakyCon name returning to being a Harry Potter only convention.

The next LeakyCon was held 19–23 October 2016, at the Marriott Hotel in Burbank, California. It was promoted as an "immersive" experience, with attendance limited to 500. The 2017 convention took place at the Citywest Hotel in Saggart, Ireland, 31 August to 3 September. Today FM reported attendance as being in the "thousands". The 2018 convention was held at the Kay Bailey Hutchison Convention Center in Dallas, Texas, for 10–12 August 2018. There were a total of 18,000 attendees.

For 2019, LeakyCon appeared at events in three cities. Two were LeakyCons: the first again in Dallas, 9–11 August 2019, at the Kay Bailey Hutchison Convention Center, with an attendance of approximately 10,000. The second was held 11–13 October 2019 at the Seaport Hotel and Seaport World Trade Center. In between these two events, LeakyCon was present at the Rose City Comic Con in Portland, Oregon from 13–15 September.

Because of COVID-19, LeakyCon's 2020 and 2021 conventions were postponed. Two conventions were held in 2022, the first in Orlando, 29–31 July, at the Orange County Convention Center; the second in Denver, Colorado, 14–16 October, at the Crowne Plaza Denver Airport Convention Center.

At the beginning of 2023, Anelli announced that LeakyCon would be distancing itself from being a Harry Potter convention. The 2023 convention was held in Chicago, Illinois, 4–6 August at McCormick Place South. The final convention was held at the Oregon Convention Center in Portland, 5–7 July 2024, and had a reported attendance of 2,800.

The convention rebranded as EnchantiCon, as announced at the final LeakyCon in July 2024.

Attendees were "an intersection of largely female, queer-friendly youth cultures". Panels included discussions on civil liberties, the cultural impact of Harry Potter as a "phenomenon", its impact on literature, and social justice. Critique also extended to literary analysis and the question of objective consumption of the series. Some panels debated what material constitutes the canon of Harry Potter. At some of the conventions, they broached controversial social issues, expanding the context of depictions in Harry Potter to the real world and allowing debate of issues such as civil rights, white privilege, and segregation. Panels also included critique of Harry Potter in relation to diversity, which extended to the representation of Korean history in relation to Fantastic Beasts: The Crimes of Grindelwald, specifically with respect to Nagini.

== Awards ==
Awards received by the site include the 2005 Yahoo! Search Find of the Year People's Choice Award, a 2002 Bloggie award, a Movies.com Fan Favorite Awards in 2004 and 2005, a Fan Site Award from J. K. Rowling and a 2006 Webby People's Voice Award.

== See also ==
- Harry Potter fandom
