= Melissa Anelli =

American author and webmistress

- Born: December 27, 1979 (age 46); Brooklyn, New York, U.S.
- Education: Georgetown University
- Occupations: Writer, webmistress, business executive
- Writing career
- Notable work: Harry, A History
- Website: melissaanelli.com

Melissa Anelli (born December 27, 1979) is an American author, webmistress and chief executive officer of Mischief Management. She is the author of Harry, A History, which chronicles the Harry Potter phenomenon. Anelli is also the full-time webmistress of The Leaky Cauldron, a commercial fansite devoted to the Harry Potter franchise for fans.

Additionally, Anelli is one of three hosts of the Leaky Cauldron's official podcast PotterCast, which talks about various aspects of the Harry Potter books, movies, video games and more. The podcast conducted a two-episode interview with Rowling in late December 2007, after the publication of Harry Potter and the Deathly Hallows.

== Early life ==
Anelli was born in Brooklyn and raised on Staten Island, New York. She is a graduate of Georgetown University, where she served as an editor for The Hoya. She became fascinated with the Harry Potter books in 2000, and active in Harry Potter fandom the following summer, shortly before the September 11 attacks in the United States. She says she was drawn into the series by its underlying message of tolerance and love, which she believes was especially needed as the United States geared for war.

== The Leaky Cauldron ==
In 2001, Anelli joined the all-volunteer staff of The Leaky Cauldron, a relatively new web site devoted to the Harry Potter universe. On her own initiative, Anelli began contacting individuals at Warner Bros., which was producing the Harry Potter films, and at Scholastic, which published the Harry Potter books in the United States. It took a year before the movie studio took her seriously and began answering her questions with reportable information, and a longer period of time before the publishers agreed to do the same. By the end of 2002, The Leaky Cauldron was receiving over 500,000 hits per day. By November 2008, largely under Anelli's influence, the site became the second most popular English-language Harry Potter fansite, with over 1 million hits per day.

In 2002, Harry Potter author J. K. Rowling announced that she would release a single index card containing 93 words that were clues to the content of the unreleased fifth novel in the series, Harry Potter and the Order of the Phoenix. The index card would be auctioned, with all proceeds benefitting Book Aid International. Anelli organized a campaign to have fans combine their money to purchase the card. She incorporated a nonprofit organization, Leaky, Inc., and became its first president. The card sold to an anonymous collector for $45,231, over six times the reserve price. Leaky, Inc. donated the $23,656 they had collected to Book Aid International.

=== Exclusive interview ===
In 2005, Rowling personally invited Anelli and Emerson Spartz, the teenage webmaster of popular fansite Mugglenet, to Edinburgh, Scotland for the release of the sixth book, Harry Potter and the Half-Blood Prince. The two were granted an exclusive interview with Rowling the day after the book was released. The only other interview Rowling granted that weekend was to a group of 70 children, aged 8–16, who were selected in various contests for the honor. Anelli and Spartz were the only Americans included. The pair published an extensive, three-part interview on their respective websites. The interview caused some controversy within the Harry Potter fandom. At one point, Spartz referred to fans who believed that characters Harry Potter and Hermione Granger would become a couple as "delusional", and Anelli and Rowling laughed. Both Spartz and Anelli received a large quantity of hate mail from fans who believed they had been insulted. One adult fan remarked that, "It was like Melissa and Emerson were our representatives, and you don't want to hear your ambassadors be so partisan. You hope that they're speaking for everyone." Anelli later commented that the irate fans had "lost the ability to divorce themselves between what J.K. Rowling is doing and what they'd like to see happen, and they've taken their disappointment and projected it onto her. I can totally understand how you could be upset if your preference didn't happen, but I can't understand or tolerate that people who claim to be her fans can be so mean to her."

=== PotterCast ===
Anelli also serves as a host of PotterCast, a Harry Potter-centered podcast sponsored by The Leaky Cauldron.

=== Victim of cyber-stalking ===
In 2008, Anelli began receiving threatening messages from Jessica Elizabeth Parker, a resident of New Zealand, whom she had banned from commenting at The Leaky Cauldron for offensive behavior. Parker continued to regularly harass Anelli for a period of 8 years, starting by sending her digital messages containing sexual and violent threats, but in later years also sending postcards and making phone calls to Anelli and her family. Anelli initially found it difficult to take legal action against Parker because she was a resident of a different country, and because cyberstalking laws were in a nascent stage, but in 2011, with the help of the FBI and Interpol, Parker was arrested in New Zealand for criminal harassment. Parker has been arrested twice more since 2011, but according to Anelli, the harassment never completely stopped.

== Career ==
Anelli's work at The Leaky Cauldron was voluntary. During the day, she worked to support herself. In 2001, Anelli began working at MTV Networks' Pages Online, a magazine for the entertainment industry. By 2004, she had become a full-time reporter for the Staten Island Advance. In 2008, Anelli was a freelance journalist based in New York City.

Her first book, Harry, A History, was released in early November 2008 and debuted at No. 18 on the New York Times Best Seller List. Tim Cornwell in The Scotsman explains that "the book captures the flavour of Pottermania, where fans' e-mails fly...with the latest breathless news of the writer and her progeny." Another review in the same paper, by Ernie Waters, says, "Anelli unravels what lies beneath the Harry Potter phenomenon and how it feels to be so wrapped up in the mystical world...It tries, and largely succeeds, to explain just what it is about the boy wizard which inspires such deep-seated devotion."

Beginning in 2009, Anelli worked as a consultant on Pottermore. She worked on the site for two years.

Since its incorporation in 2011, Anelli has served as CEO of Mischief Management, LLC.
