= Jean Meltzer =

Jewish American novelist

- Education: New York University Tisch School of the Arts (BFA)
- Occupations: Author, producer
- Writing career
- Genre: Jewish adult romance
- Notable awards: Daytime Emmy; 2004 Assignment Discovery – Producer
- Website: jeanmeltzer.com

Jean Meltzer is a Jewish American author, former producer, writer, director for Tapestry International, and a Daytime Emmy Award winner. In 2006, she left the television industry to study in rabbinical schools and seminars in Jerusalem for five years until she left as a result of myalgic encephalomyelitis. In 2022, the rights to her novel The Matzah Ball have been optioned. Along with Lance Bass Productions and Brett Gursky, it is to be produced by Sugar23.

== Early life and education ==
Meltzer was born to an American Jewish family. She grew up keeping kashrut and attending Hebrew schools. She attended New York University Tisch School of the Arts, Department of Dramatic Writing, and received her Bachelor of Fine Arts in 2002. Meltzer lives in Virginia.

== Career ==
=== Television career ===
After graduating from college, Meltzer worked as creative director of Tapestry International. She worked as a producer for several shows including Assignment Discovery which won the 2004 Daytime Emmy Award for Outstanding Children's Series. She also directed episodes of the show TLC Elementary School, which she also served as a producer for, and was as a writer for the television film Christmas and the Civil War. Meltzer is currently serving as a producer to the upcoming movie The Matzah Ball which is based on her novel by the same name. Meltzer left the television industry in 2006.

=== Writing career ===
Meltzer writes adult romance with Jewish main characters. Her debut novel The Matzah Ball, centered around a Hanukkah romance, was published in 2021. Since then, she has written four more books: Mr. Perfect on Paper, Kissing Kosher, Magical Meet Cute, and The Eight Heartbreaks of Hanukkah. In an interview about Jewish representation in her books, she explained that one reason for writing Jewish stories is her niece, saying:

“I didn’t have happy Jewish stories growing up and I realized my niece needed these types of stories, so I sat down and wrote a book for her,”.

== Bibliography ==
- The Matzah Ball (2021)
- Mr. Perfect on Paper (2022)
- Kissing Kosher (2023)
- Magical Meet Cute (2024)
- The Eight Heartbreaks of Hanukkah (2025)

== Filmography ==
=== Producer ===
- 1995 TLC Elementary School
- 2003 - 2006 Assignment Discovery
- 2004 Understanding
- Upcoming - The Matzah Ball

=== Writer ===
- 2006 Christmas and the Civil War

=== Director ===
- 1995 TLC Elementary School

== Awards ==
=== Television ===
Year	Award	Category	Work	Result	Ref
2004	Daytime Emmy Award	Outstanding Children's Series	Assignment Discovery	Won	
2006	CINE Competition	Telecast - Professional Non-Fiction Division: Children's Programs	Assignment Discovery	Won	
2007	Daytime Emmy Award	Outstanding Children's Series	Assignment Discovery	Nominated	
2008	Daytime Emmy Award	Outstanding New Approaches - Children's	Assignment Discovery	Nominated	
