= Jeremy Jordan =

Jeremy Jordan may refer to:

- Jeremy Jordan (singer, born 1973), American actor and singer, notable for songs in the 1990s such as "The Right Kind of Love"
- Jeremy Jordan (actor, born 1984), American actor and singer, notable for being an actor and Broadway performer

== See also ==
- Jeremiah Jordan (1830–1911), Irish nationalist Member of Parliament from 1885 to 1910
