= Truth & Justice (podcast) =

True crime podcast

- Genre: Crime
- Language: English

Cast and voices
- Hosted by: Bob Ruff

Publication
- Original release: 2015
- Provider: NBI Studios

Related
- Website: www.truthandjusticepod.com

Truth & Justice is a podcast by Bob Ruff, a former fire chief. Its focus is people who Ruff believes have been wrongfully convicted of crimes. It started as Ruff's investigation into the killing of Hae Min Lee, the subject of the first season of the popular podcast Serial. Ruff says its mission is to "uncover the truth and seek justice for the victims and wrongfully convicted alike."

Its investigation led to the innocence project of Texas taking up the case and Ed Ates was paroled in 2018. Ed Ates, who was convicted of murder in Smith County, Texas. None of the collected blood, hair, semen or fingerprints matched Ates, who continues to insist that he is innocent.

The podcast was started as a response to Serial's investigation Lee's killing and Adnan Syed's subsequent murder conviction.

As of November 2018, the podcast was investigating the case of Sandra Melgar, who was convicted of murdering her husband Jaime Melgar. The police were suspicious of Sandra, who has epilepsy, because she told the police she could not remember what had happened. Jaime was stabbed to death after a struggle, and Sandra was found tied up at the scene. Her hands were not injured. Ruff believes Sandra was telling the truth and is innocent.

In April 2019, the podcast offered a $20,000 reward for the arrest and conviction of the killer of Jaime Melgar.

The podcast is crowdsourced and much of the investigation is performed by listeners.

== See also ==
- Rabia Chaudry
