= Harry, A History =

2008 book by Melissa Anelli

- Author: Melissa Anelli
- Language: English
- Genre: Non-fiction
- Publisher: Pocket
- Publication date: November 4, 2008
- Publication place: United States
- Media type: Print (Paperback)
- Pages: 368 (US)

Harry, A History: The True Story of a Boy Wizard, His Fans, and Life Inside the Harry Potter Phenomenon is a non-fiction book authored by Melissa Anelli, the webmistress of the popular Harry Potter fansite The Leaky Cauldron. The book, which includes a foreword by J. K. Rowling, was published on November 4, 2008. It chronicles the rise of the Harry Potter series and its impact on popular culture, detailing the publication history, the development of the online fan community, and the broader cultural phenomenon surrounding the series. Anelli, having been deeply involved in the Harry Potter fandom, provides an insider's perspective on the events and experiences that shaped the community during the height of the series' popularity.

== Content overview ==
Harry, A History provides a comprehensive look at the Harry Potter phenomenon from the perspective of Melissa Anelli, the webmistress of The Leaky Cauldron. The book covers various aspects of the Harry Potter series' impact on popular culture, including the development of the online fan community, the publication history, and the broader cultural significance of the series. It includes remembrances from key figures such as J. K. Rowling's editors, agents, and publicists, as well as fans and Rowling herself. The narrative is interspersed with Anelli's personal experiences, such as helping Scholastic stop leaks, hosting live PotterCasts, and interviewing J. K. Rowling. The book also explores the lasting impact of the Harry Potter series on the way books are read and the sense of wonder it restored in its readers.

== Chapters ==
The book is structured into several chapters, each focusing on different aspects of the Harry Potter phenomenon. The chapters include:

- Foreword: Written by J. K. Rowling, this section discusses her life in relation to the Harry Potter series and her appreciation for the fansite The Leaky Cauldron.
- The Beginning and the End: Covers the early days of the Harry Potter series and its eventual conclusion.
- Near Misses: Details close calls and challenges faced during the publication and promotion of the series.
- Public Assistance: Discusses the role of the public and fans in the success of Harry Potter.
- Spinning the Web: Focuses on the development of the online Harry Potter community.
- Rocking at Hogwarts: Explores the phenomenon of wizard rock bands.
- Work Life: Describes the professional life of those involved in the Harry Potter series.
- Getting a Clue: Investigates the mysteries and clues within the Harry Potter books.
- Banned and Burned: Discusses the controversies and attempts to ban the Harry Potter series.
- High Seas: Covers issues related to piracy and unauthorized distribution.
- Access: Details the access granted to fans and media.
- The Interview: Features The Leaky Cauldron's interview with J. K. Rowling.
- Independence: Discusses the independent nature of the Harry Potter fandom.
- On the (Internet) Radio: Explores the role of internet radio in the Harry Potter community.
- Spoiled: Looks at the impact of spoilers on the reading experience.
- One Day More: Reflects on the anticipation leading up to the release of the final book.
- Deathly Hallows: Covers the release and reception of Harry Potter and the Deathly Hallows.
- Epilogue: Provides a concluding reflection on the Harry Potter phenomenon.
- Acknowledgments: Lists the people who contributed to the creation of the book.
- Notes: Contains additional information and references.
- Bibliography: Lists the sources referenced in the book.

== Enhanced e-book ==
On July 5, 2011, an updated and enhanced e-book version of Harry, A History was released. This edition includes a new section titled "Four Years Later", where Melissa Anelli discusses significant events in the Harry Potter fandom that occurred after the original publication of the book. These events include the opening of the Wizarding World of Harry Potter theme park, various conferences such as LeakyCon, the activities of the International Quidditch Association, the work of the Harry Potter Alliance, The Harry Potter Lexicon trial, and the production of StarKid's A Very Potter Musical. Additionally, the enhanced e-book features the transcript of Anelli's extensive interview with J. K. Rowling, where Rowling reflects on her life during the years she was writing and publishing the Harry Potter series. The e-book also includes multimedia elements such as scenes from the PotterCast/Harry and the Potters 2007 tour, clips of Muggle Quidditch, and an exclusive trailer for A Very Potter Sequel.
