= The Harry Potter Lexicon =

Online encyclopedia of the Harry Potter series

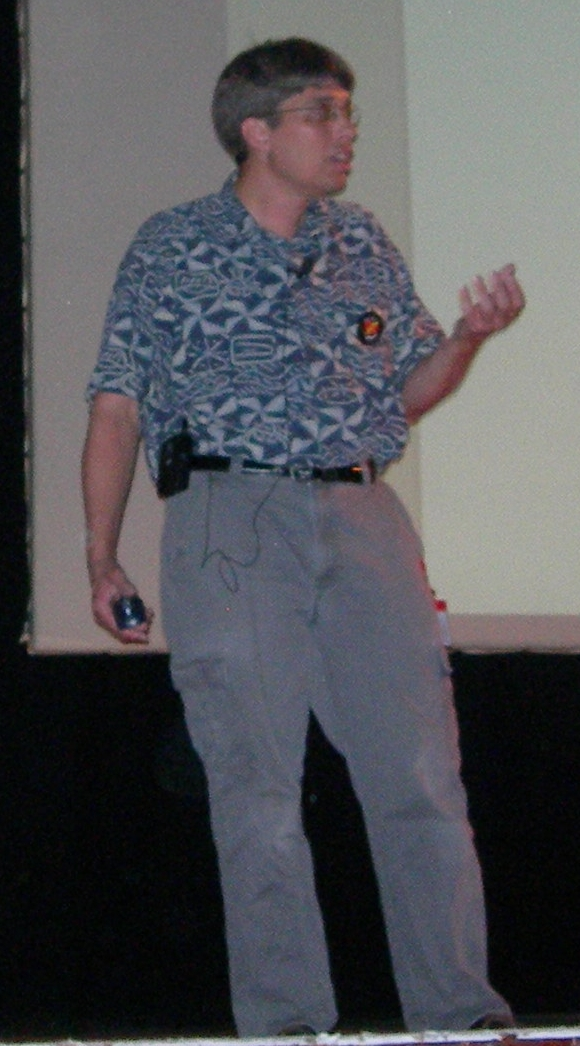
Steve Vander Ark, creator of the Harry Potter Lexicon, speaking at the Sectus conference in London in 2007

The Harry Potter Lexicon is a fan-created online encyclopedia of the Harry Potter series.

== Overview ==
The site was created by American school librarian and drama teacher Steve Vander Ark. It contains detailed information for all seven published Harry Potter books. The Lexicon lists characters, places, creatures, spells, potions and magical devices, as well as analyzing magical theory and other details of the series. The Lexicon is credited as creating one of the first timelines of all events occurring in the Harry Potter universe. A similar timeline of events was adopted by Warner Bros. for inclusion with their Harry Potter film DVDs, and was accepted by author J. K. Rowling as conforming to her works.

The Lexicon is a winner of J. K. Rowling's Fan Site Award. Rowling said:

This is such a great site that I have been known to sneak into an internet café while out writing and check a fact rather than go into a bookshop and buy a copy of Harry Potter (which is embarrassing). A website for the dangerously obsessive; my natural home.

== Lawsuit ==
On October 31, 2007, J. K. Rowling and Warner Brothers filed a lawsuit against RDR Books over the publication of Vander Ark's Lexicon in book form. The lawsuit was heard in a New York court on April 14, 2008, so precedent from the Second Circuit applies. Rowling was represented by Marvin S. Putnam.

The lawsuit states:

The infringing book is particularly troubling as it is in direct contravention to Ms. Rowling's repeatedly stated intention to publish her own companion books to the series.

The result of the lawsuit was that the book could be published, but not in its present form. A modified version of the book was published in 2009. This case went to bench trial in the New York Federal District Court of Judge Robert Patterson on April 14, 2008. RDR Books’ defense team, which includes solo San Francisco practitioner, Lizbeth Hasse of the Creative Industry Law Group, solo New York practitioner David Hammer, and the Fair Use Project at Stanford University Law School, has replied to the suit, arguing:

In support of her position Ms Rowling appears to claim a monopoly on the right to publish literary reference guides, and other non-academic research, relating to her own fiction. This is a right no court has ever recognized. It has little to recommend it. If accepted, it would dramatically extend the reach of copyright protection, and eliminate an entire genre of literary supplements: third party reference guides to fiction, which for centuries have helped readers better access, understand and enjoy literary works.

Rowling stated that her efforts to halt the publishing of the Lexicon have been crushing her creativity, and said that she was not sure if she has "the will or the heart" to now publish her own encyclopedia.

On 8 September 2008, Rowling won her copyright case against RDR Books. The judge concluded that there was too much direct quotation (attributed and unattributed) and that though the books was transformative in respect of the Harry Potter series, it was less transformative of the "schoolbooks" (Magical Creatures and History of Quidditch). The minimum award was made of $750 for each of the infringed works, for a total of $6,750, and an injunction was made preventing publication of the book in its then current form.

Lexicon publisher RDR Books said:

We are encouraged by the fact the court recognized that as a general matter authors do not have the right to stop the publication of reference guides and companion books about literary works. As for the Lexicon, we are obviously disappointed with the result, and RDR is considering all of its options.

== Publication ==
In December 2008, a modified (and shorter) version of Vander Ark's Lexicon was approved for publication and was released January 16, 2009 as The Lexicon: An Unauthorized Guide to Harry Potter Fiction.

== See also ==
- Harry Potter fandom
