= Voldemort (disambiguation) =

Voldemort is the main antagonist in Harry Potter.

Voldemort may also refer to:

== Popular culture ==
- Voldemort: Origins of the Heir, a fantasy film
- Voldemort Can't Stop the Rock!, an album by Harry and the Potters
- Algospeak, also called Voldemorting, a social media practice

== Science and technology ==
- Voldemort effect, a social phenomenon
- Voldemort (distributed data store), a software project
- Leptanilla voldemort, a species of subterranean ant found in Australia
