= Harry and the Potters discography =

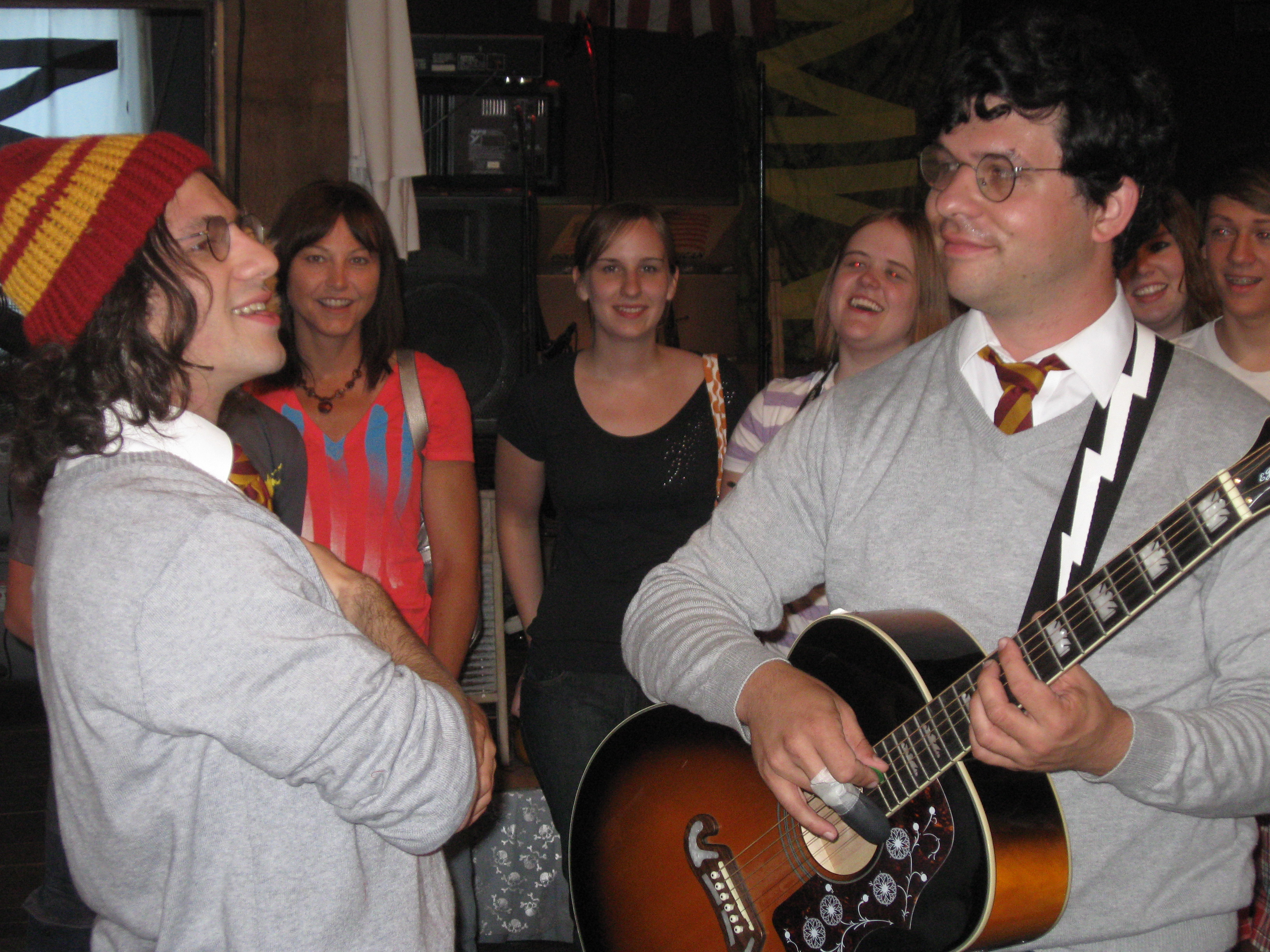
- Harry and the Potters performing in June 2010.
- Studio albums: 3
- Extended plays: 6
- Other albums: 4
- Miscellaneous releases: 5
- Side projects: 2

Harry and the Potters are an American wizard rock band formed in Norwood, Massachusetts in 2002 by brothers Joe and Paul DeGeorge. They have released three studio albums, three singles, three extended plays, four other albums, five miscellaneous releases and two side projects. All material has been released by the independent record label Eskimo Laboratories which the duo founded.

Their eponymous debut studio album Harry and the Potters was released in 2003. They released their second studio album, Voldemort Can't Stop the Rock! in 2004. The band released their third studio album, Power of Love in 2006.

They released two EPs, "Scarred for Life" and an untitled split with the Zambonis, on vinyl in 2006. The following year, the released their third extended play, The Enchanted Ceiling. The band released their fourth extended play, In the Cupboard, in 2008 and released their fifth extended play, Live at the Yule Ball, in late 2009. They released a sixth EP, Hedwig Lives, in 2015.

In 2008, the band were unsure as to whether they would work on a new studio album. In April 2010, Paul DeGeorge revealed that Harry and the Potters is contemplating making a fourth studio album. He explained, "But maybe there's something like that [a Deathly Hallows-related full length] in the future. It's hard to say right now."

== Studio albums ==
=== Harry and the Potters ===
Harry and the Potters

Studio album by Harry and the Potters
- Released: 21 June 2003
- Recorded: April–May 2003 at the DeGeorge family living room
- Length: 38:27

Harry and the Potters is the eponymous debut studio album by indie rock band Harry and the Potters, released on 21 June 2003. The album was inspired by the first four novels in the Harry Potter book series. It has been released on CD and digital download. In April 2003, the brothers wrote an entire album's worth of songs. The brothers split songwriting responsibilities between the two of them: Joe was responsible for songs dealing with Harry Potter and the Prisoner of Azkaban, whereas Paul was responsible for songs dealing with Harry Potter and the Chamber of Secrets. Harry and the Potters was recorded at the DeGeorge Family Living Room in Massachusetts. According to Melissa Anelli, Paul wrote the majority of the instrumental tracks on his Casio keyboard, whereas Joe conceptualized most of the vocal tracks. Vocalist Paul DeGeorge later said, "We were pretty much writing songs and then recording them on the spot". This statement emphasizes the band's do-it-yourself amateurishness as an essential aspect of the album. In recording Harry and the Potters, the band aimed to release the album shortly before the fifth book in the Harry Potter series, Harry Potter and the Order of the Phoenix was released. According to Paul, "We were in a rush to get that stuff done before the 5th book release" and this instinct supports claims it took only two weekends to record the album. Despite the band's purported rush to finish the album, Paul and Joe worked particularly hard on the song "These Days are Dark." Paul DeGeorge used $1,200 of his own money to finance the pressing of the CDs.

Track listing

No.	Title	Length
1.	"I am a Wizard"	2:34
2.	"Platform 9 and ¾"	1:04
3.	"The Dark Lord Lament"	2:02
4.	"Fluffy"	0:17
5.	"Wizard Chess"	1:26
6.	"Problem Solving Skillz"	1:43
7.	"Back to School"	1:22
8.	"The Foil (Malfoy)"	1:35
9.	"Follow the Spiders"	1:34
10.	"Save Ginny Weasley"	3:02
11.	"2 Weeks to Myself"	3:10
12.	"Gryffindor Rocks"	1:36
13.	"The Firebolt"	1:26
14.	"My Teacher is a Werewolf"	0:36
15.	"The Godfather"	2:37
16.	"The Fourth Triwizard Champion"	2:14
17.	"The Yule Ball"	2:25
18.	"These Days are Dark"	5:27
Total length:		38:27

=== Voldemort Can't Stop the Rock! ===
Voldemort Can't Stop the Rock!

Studio album by Harry and the Potters
- Released: July 1, 2004
- Recorded: May – June 2004 at the DeGeorge family shed, Norwood, Massachusetts
- Length: 41:58

Voldemort Can't Stop the Rock! is the second studio album by indie rock band Harry and the Potters, released on July 1, 2004. The album was primarily inspired by the fifth novel in the Harry Potter book series.

=== Harry and the Potters and the Power of Love ===
Power of Love

Studio album by Harry and the Potters
- Released: July 4, 2006
- Recorded: February – June 2006 at April Fog, basement of Norwood High School, Cambridge, Massachusetts and the DeGeorge family living room, Norwood, Massachusetts
- Length: 42:51

Harry and the Potters and the Power of Love, or Power of Love, is the third studio album by indie rock band Harry and the Potters, released on July 4, 2006. The album was primarily inspired by the sixth novel in the Harry Potter book series. The engineer is Kevin Micka.

=== Lumos ===
Lumos

Studio album by Harry and the Potters
- Released: June 21, 2019
- Recorded: 2018
- Studios: Bang-a-Song Studios, Lawrence, Kansas Public Library

Lumos is the name of the fourth studio album by indie rock band Harry and the Potters. The band announced the album at a live show on March 30, 2018, at which they debuted songs about The Deathly Hallows. The band later announced that the album would also feature the anti-folk musician Kimya Dawson as a guest vocalist. Parts of this album were recorded in a studio, and others were recorded at the Lawrence, Kansas public library. On April 23, 2019, the band unveiled a Kickstarter to help recoup the cost of recording the album, which they revealed was named Lumos. Backers could also choose rewards that include an additional album entitled Mostly Camping, as well as a vinyl single called the "Harry Potter Boogie."

== Extended plays ==
=== Scarred for Life ===
Scarred for Life

EP by Harry and the Potters
- Released: July 4, 2006
- Recorded: January 2006 Soundtrack Boston, Massachusetts
- Label: 6:02

Scarred for Life is the first EP released in 2006. It was limited to 1000 copies but physical copies are now out of print. All songs were later released on Priori Incantatem.

Track listing

No.	Title	Length
1.	"The Blood of a Prince"	3:01
2.	"Sectumsempra"	0:28
3.	"Horcruxes"	2:22
Total length:		6:02

=== Split with The Zambonis ===
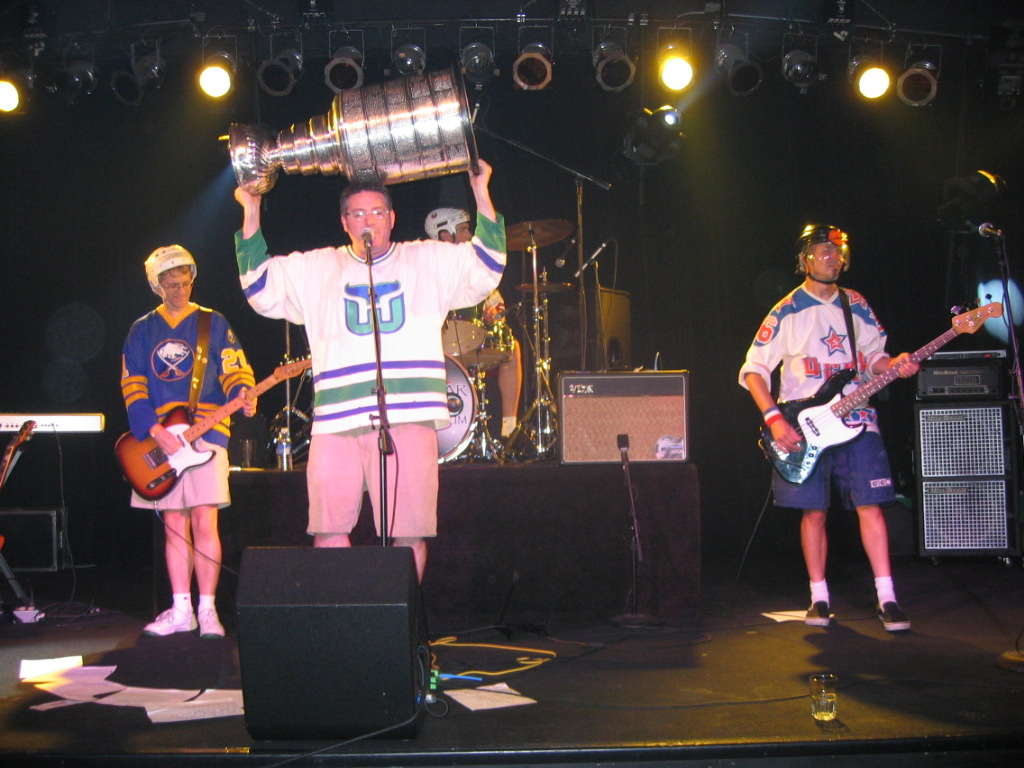
The Zambonis (as pictured)

Split with The Zambonis

EP by Harry and the Potters and The Zambonis
- Released: December 2006
- Recorded: January 2006 Soundtrack Boston, Massachusetts
- Length: 6:17

A split EP by Harry and the Potters and The Zambonis was released in 2006. It was limited to 600 copies and limited physical copies still available for purchase. Harry and the Potters songs were later released on Priori Incantatem.

Track listing

No.	Title	Performer	Length
1.	"The Forbidden Forest Hockey League"	Harry and the Potters	1:55
2.	"The Hogwarts Tonsil Hockey Team"	Harry and the Potters	0:57
3.	"Concept Bands 'R' Us"	The Zambonis	0:11
4.	"Harry Potter's Magic Hockey Stick"	The Zambonis	3:14
Total length:			6:17

=== The Enchanted Ceiling ===
The Enchanted Ceiling

EP by Harry and the Potters
- Released: July 2007
- Recorded: DeGeorge Family Living Room, March 2007
- Length: 13:45

The Enchanted Ceiling is the third extended play from wizard rock and indie rock band, Harry and the Potters. It was released in July 2007. The album was primarily inspired by the first two novels in the Harry Potter book series. It was released in a limited run of 1000CDs as the Wizard Rock EP of the Month for July 2007. It was later released for digital download. After three albums, Paul DeGeorge of Harry and the Potters decided to start a subscription-based Wizard Rock EP of the Month club. During March 2007, the brothers decided to record write as many songs as possible and record them in one weekend. The brothers recorded the songs in their living room. The album was later released in July 2007 through the Wizard Rock EP of the Month Club.

Some of the songs on the EP were actually written before March 2007: "Harry Potter" was written on the band's very first tour and a demo of "Rocking at Hogwarts" was featured on the band's Mail Songs #1. The demo of the latter contains the first recorded mention of the term "wizard rock."

Track listing

No.	Title	Length
1.	"Harry Potter"	0:49
2.	"Rockin' at Hogwarts"	0:45
3.	"Haircut"	0:56
4.	"Phoenix Tears"	1:26
5.	"Hermione Screws Up the Polyjuice Potion"	0:28
6.	"The Enchanted Ceiling"	0:59
7.	"Never Going to the Bathroom Again"	1:49
8.	"Accio Hagrid"	0:34
9.	"Honeydukes"	0:17
10.	"Ms. Norris"	1:00
11.	"Hedwig's Cage"	1:20
12.	"The Radio"	0:30
13.	"Everlasting Icicles"	0:50
14.	"The Gringotts Goblin Coaster"	2:02
Total length:		13:45

=== In the Cupboard ===
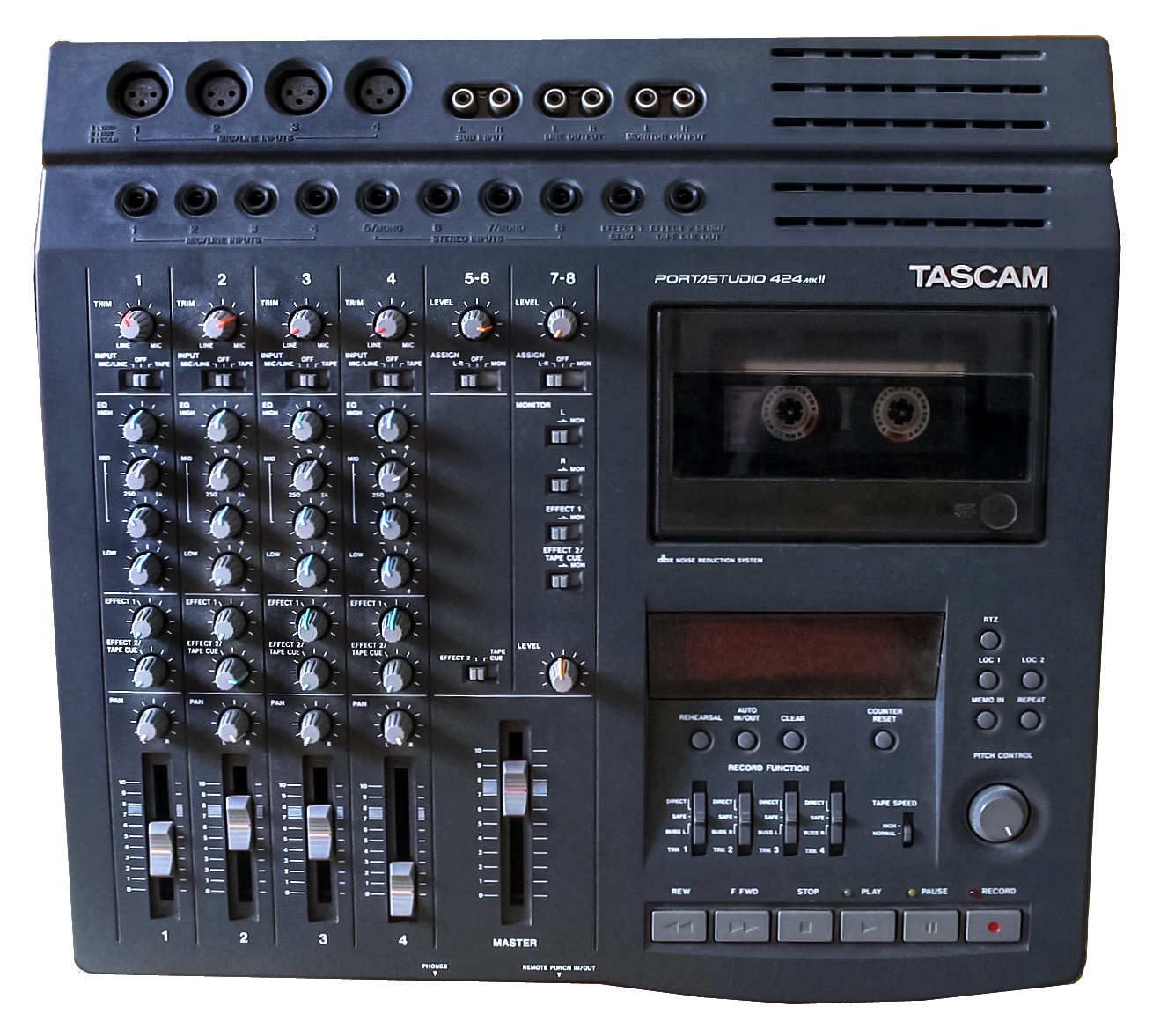
Joe and Paul recorded the band's second extended play In the Cupboard in their parents' basement on a TASCAM Portastudio 424 (as pictured)

In the Cupboard

EP by Harry and the Potters
- Released: July 2008
- Recorded: DeGeorge Family Basement May 14–16, 2008
- Length: 16:22

In the Cupboard is the fourth extended play from wizard rock and indie rock band, Harry and the Potters. It was released in July 2008. It was released in a limited run of 1250CDs for the Wizard Rock EP of the Month in July 2008. After three albums, and several EPs, including one from the Wizard Rock EP of the Month club, Harry and the Potters decided to record another EP for the EP of the Month Club. On May 14–16, the brothers wrote an EPs worth of songs. The brothers recorded the extended play in their parents' basement, capturing the songs on a Portastudio TASCAM 424. According to Paul DeGeorge, the album is mainly "about weird inconsistencies and silly nitpicking [in the Harry Potter novels]."

Fourteen songs were recorded, but only ten songs were included. The songs "My New School," "Unicorn Blood," "Touch the Brains," and "Maybe Kreacher Will Bring Me a Sandwich" were later released on the compilation album Priori Incantatem. Paul DeGeorge later stated that the songs didn't feel right for the EP.

Track listing

No.	Title	Length
1.	"Priori Incantatem"	1:28
2.	"The Economics of the Wizarding World Don't Make Sense"	1:50
3.	"Alohomora"	1:51
4.	"The Chamber"	1:48
5.	"Dudley!!!"	0:49
6.	"Fleur is Fine"	1:22
7.	"Expulsion During Disapparation"	1:39
8.	"Nearly Headless Nick"	1:09
9.	"Ted"	1:35
10.	"Ice Cream Man"	2:51
Total length:		16:22

=== Harry and the Potters at the Yule Ball ===
Harry and the Potters at the Yule Ball

EP (Live) by Harry and the Potters
- Released: December 2009
- Recorded: December 2008 The Middle East, Cambridge, Massachusetts
- Length: 76:41

Harry and the Potters at the Yule Ball is the fifth extended play from wizard rock and indie rock band, Harry and the Potters. It was released in December 2009 as a CD/DVD combo in a limited run of 1000 copies. The album was recorded live at the Fourth Annual Yule Ball. It was selected as the Wizard Rock EP of the Month for December 2009.

Track listing
1. "Yule Ball" - 3:00; 2. "Xmas Rulez, Voldmort Droolz" - 1:53; 3. "I'm a Wizard" - 2:35; 4. "Wizard Chess" - 2:35; 5. "Save Ginny Weasley" - 3:48; 6. "Felix Felicis" - 2:40; 7. "Meet Me Under the Mistletoe" - 2:22; 8. "Everlasting Icicles" - 1:07; 9. "How Hagrid Saved Christmas" - 8:54; 10. "Keeping Secrets From Me" - 1:44; 11. "Stick it to Dolores" - 1:57; 12. "The Human Hosepipe" - 3:05; 13. "The Hogwarts Tonsil Hockey Team" - 1:16; 14. "This Book is so Awesome" - 0:38; 15. "Christmas Shopping for Dobby" - 2:04; 16. "Ice Cream Man" - 2:44; 17. "Gringotts Goblin Coaster" - 3:34; 18. "New Wizard Anthem" - 1:49; 19. "We Save Ron's Live, Part VIII" - 2:43; 20. "Accio Hagrid" - 0:44; 21. "Save Ginny Weasley From Dean Thomas" - 4:32; 22. "The Weapon" - 4:41; 23. "Dumbledore" - 6:21; 24. "Xmas at Hogwarts" - 4:14; 25. "Frosty the Snowman" - 1:17; 26. "Let it Snow" - 0:51; 27. "Rudolph the Red-Nosed Reindeer" - 0:57; 28. "Smells Like Harry Potter" - 3:11

=== Hedwig Lives ===
Hedwig Lives

EP by Harry and the Potters
- Released: April 7, 2015
- Recorded: April 11, 2012 by Mike Bridavsky at Russian Recording, Bloomington, IN
- Length: 4:28

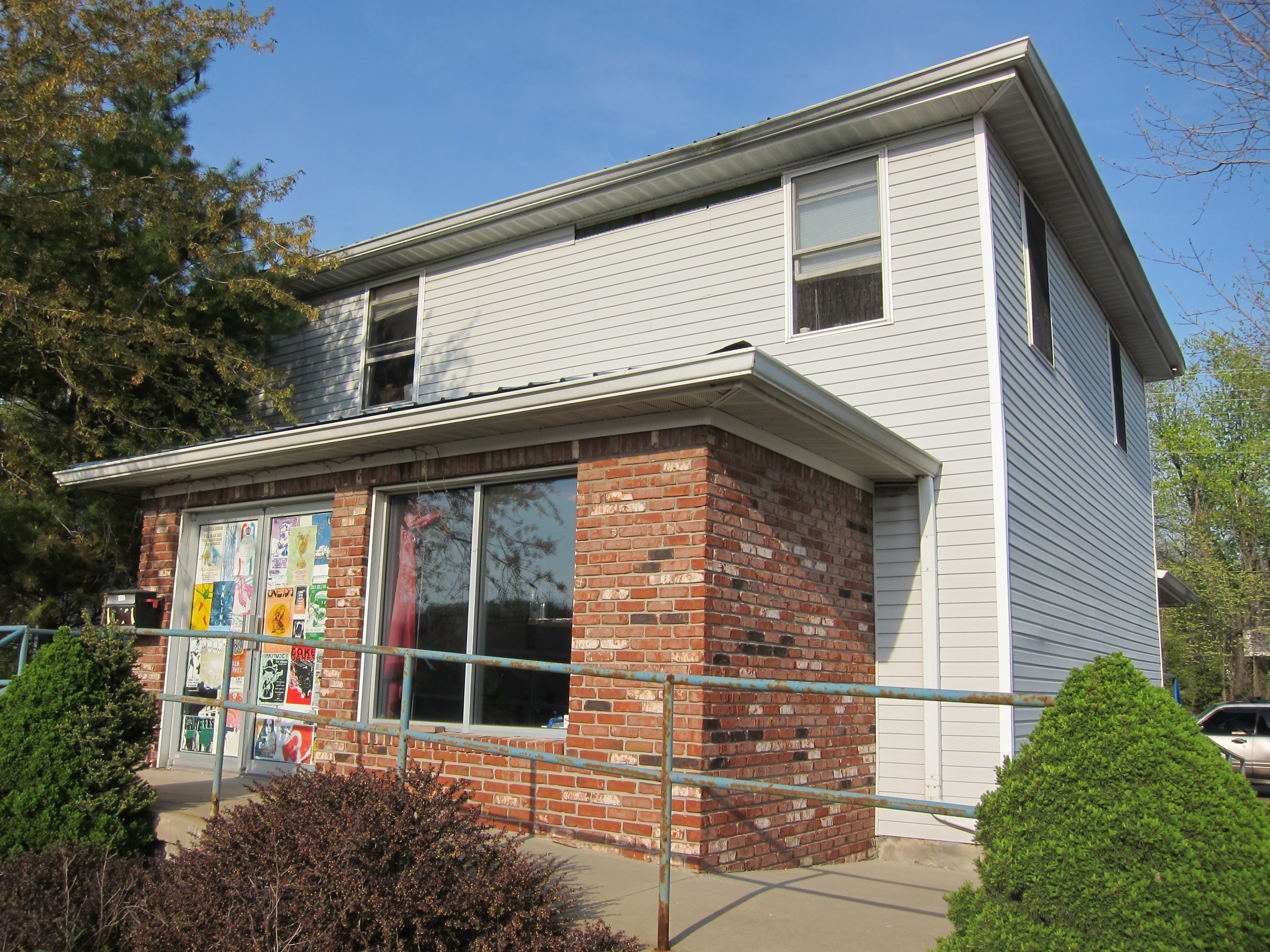
The band recorded their third single "Hedwig Lives" at Russian Recording (as pictured) in Bloomington, Indiana

Hedwig Lives is the sixth EP, released by the band in 2015.

1. "The Great Motorcycle Explosion of ’97" – 3:34
2. "Ridin' in the Night" – 0:54

== Other albums ==
=== Priori Incantatem ===
Priori Incantatem

Compilation album (Double) by Harry and the Potters
- Released: 22 May 2009
- Recorded: 2002–2009
- Length: 73:02

Priori Incantatem is the first compilation album from wizard rock and indie rock band, Harry and the Potters. It is a double album. It was released in May 2009. The album is a collection of the band's previously unreleased songs, compilations appearances, songs from their out-of-print EPs, remixes and demos. The first disc was released on the CD format and for digital download, whereas the second disc was released exclusively on the CD format.

The physical release was limited to 1000 copies; disc one was later released for digital download. Previously unreleased songs "Diagon Alley" and "The Wrath of Hermione" were recorded during Harry and the Potters sessions.

Track listing
Disc one: All songs by Paul and Joe DeGeorge, except "The Cave", written by Darius Wilkins.; 1. "Problem Solving Skillz (2002 Demo)" – 1:56; 2. "New Wizard Anthem (Club Mix)" – 1:49; 3. "The Blood of a Prince" – 3:01; 4. "Sectumsempra" – 0:27; 5. "Horcruxes" – 2:21; 6. "Don't Believe It" – 3:59; 7. "The Forbidden Forest Hockey League" – 1:55; 8. "The Hogwarts Tonsil Hockey Team" – 0:58; 9. "My Teacher is a Werewolf (Rock Version)" – 0:46; 10. "The Stone" – 1:21; 11. "Let's Drink to Aragog" – 2:31; 12. "The Cave" – 2:56; 13. "Vernon Dursley" – 0:46; 14. "Bacon" – 2:05; 15. "Maybe Kreacher Will Bring Me a Sandwich" – 1:35; 16. "My New School" – 0:37; 17. "Unicorn Blood" – 1:06; 18. "Touch the Brains" – 0:32; 19. "Bertie Botts" – 1:02; 20. "Diagon Alley" – 0:28; 21. "The Wrath of Hermione" – 1:46; 22. "It Ain't Easy" – 10:10; Disc two: All songs by Paul and Joe DeGeorge.; 1. "Save Ginny Weasley" – 3:06; 2. "These Days are Dark" – 3:41; 3. "Rocking at Hogwarts" – 0:21; 4. "Problem Solving Skillz (Skillz to Pay the Billz)" – 1:59; 5. "The Godfather, Part II" – 3:02; 6. "Stick it to Dolores" – 1:38; 7. "The Missing Arm of Viktor Krum" – 1:43; 8. "Smootchy Smootchy Pukey Pukey" – 1:48; 9. "Monkey Suit" – 3:18; 10. "This Book is so Awesome" – 0:26; 11. "Platform 9 and 3/4" (Dutch Version) – 0:44; 12. "Hermione Screws up the Polyjuice Potion" – 0:29; 13. "Hagrid" – 0:20; 14. "Phoenix Tears" – 1:22; 15. "Ridin’ in the Night" – 1:04; 16. "Phoenix Song" – 5:55

=== Remixes ===
Remixes

Remix album by Harry and the Potters and Friends
- Released: 18 November 2010
- Recorded: 2007–2010
- Length: 16:36

Remixes is the first remix album from wizard rock and indie rock band, Harry and the Potters. It was released on 18 November 2010. The band released it for ditial download via Bandcamp, using the sites ability to ask potential buyers to name their own price. It features various fan-submitted remixes.

Track listing
1. "Felix Felicis [Best Person Alive Mix]" - 0:36; Remix by Harry and the Potters & Lauren and Kate; 2. "Phoenix Tears [Burning Day Remix]" - 1:39; Remix by Harry and the Potters & Erwin Beekveld; 3. "Hermione Screws Up the Polyjuice Potion [Gato's Lesson Plan]" - 1:06; Remix by Harry and the Potters & Dawlish and the Archies; 4. "Felix Felicis [Dumbledore's DS Mix]" - 1:53; Remix by Harry and the Potters & Paradise Dan; 5. "New Wizard Anthem [Roonil Wazlib Beat Mix]" - 2:36; Remix by Harry and the Potters & Erwin Beekveld; 6. "Gryffindor Rocks [House Elf Mix]" - 3:01; Remix by Harry and the Potters & Dobby and the House Elves; 7. "Felix Felicis [Eighth Clockwise Stir Mix]" - 2:09; Remix by Harry and the Potters & Erwin Beekveld; 8. "Save Ginny Weasley" - 3:38; Remix/Cover by Dumbledore’s Chorus

=== A Wizardly Christmas of Wizardry ===
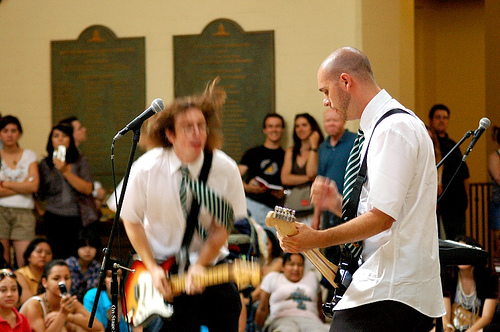
Wizard rock band Draco and the Malfoys (as pictured) appear on the album's final two tracks.

A Wizardly Christmas of Wizardry

Compilation album (Christmas) by Harry and the Potters
- Released: 8 December 2010
- Recorded: 2005–2010
- Length: 48:27

A Wizardly Christmas of Wizardry is the second compilation album from wizard rock and indie rock band, Harry and the Potters. It is a Christmas album. The album is composed of new songs and older songs that have appeared on various Christmas compilations. It was released in December 2010. The band released the album exclusively as a digital download via Bandcamp and iTunes.

The album contains various Christmas songs, some brand new and others previously released. "Yule Ball 2005 Cassette" and "Yule Ball 2006 Cassette" are each complete collections of the three songs released at the 2005 and the 2006 Yule Balls. The first features appearances by wizard rock bands The House Elves and Draco and the Malfoys, and the second features appearances by The Hungarian Horntails and Draco and the Malfoys.

Bradley Mehlenbacher plays drums on tracks 1-5, 7 and 10, and Amanda Hurley plays drums on track 8. It was mastered by Dan Brennan, and recorded, produced and the artwork was designed by Harry and the Potters.

No.	Title	Original album(s)	Length
1.	"Xmas Rulez, Voldemort Droolz"	The Leaky Cauldon’s Jingle Spells compilation (2007)	1:59
2.	"Livin’ in a Mirror"	new song	4:25
3.	"Christmas Shopping for Dobby"	The Leaky Cauldon’s Jingle Spells 3 compilation (2009)	1:53
4.	"The Firebolt (2010)"	re-recording, original song on Harry and the Potters (2003)	1:10
5.	"The Yule Ball (2010)"	re-recording, original song on Harry and the Potters (2003)	2:17
6.	"Meet Me Under the Mistletoe"	Eskimo Labrotories' A Magical Christmas of Magic compilation (2005)	2:02
7.	"When Bellatrix Came Over for Christmas/What?!"	The Leaky Cauldon’s Jingle Spells 4 compilation (2010)	0:50
8.	"Christmas at Hogwarts"	Eskimo Labrotories' A Magical Christmas of Magic compilation (2005)	2:04
9.	"Hedwig is Coming to Town (Snowy Owl)"	The Leaky Cauldon’s Jingle Spells 2 compilation (2008)	2:56
10.	"The Enchanted Ceiling (Live at the Yule Ball 2007)"	live performance, original song on The Enchanted Ceiling (2007)	8:47
11.	"Yule Ball 2005 Cassette"	2005 compilation with Draco and the Malfoys and The House Elves	10:02
12.	"Yule Ball 2006 Cassette"	2006 compilation with Draco and the Malfoys and The Hungarian Horntails	10:02

=== Live at the New York Public Library ===
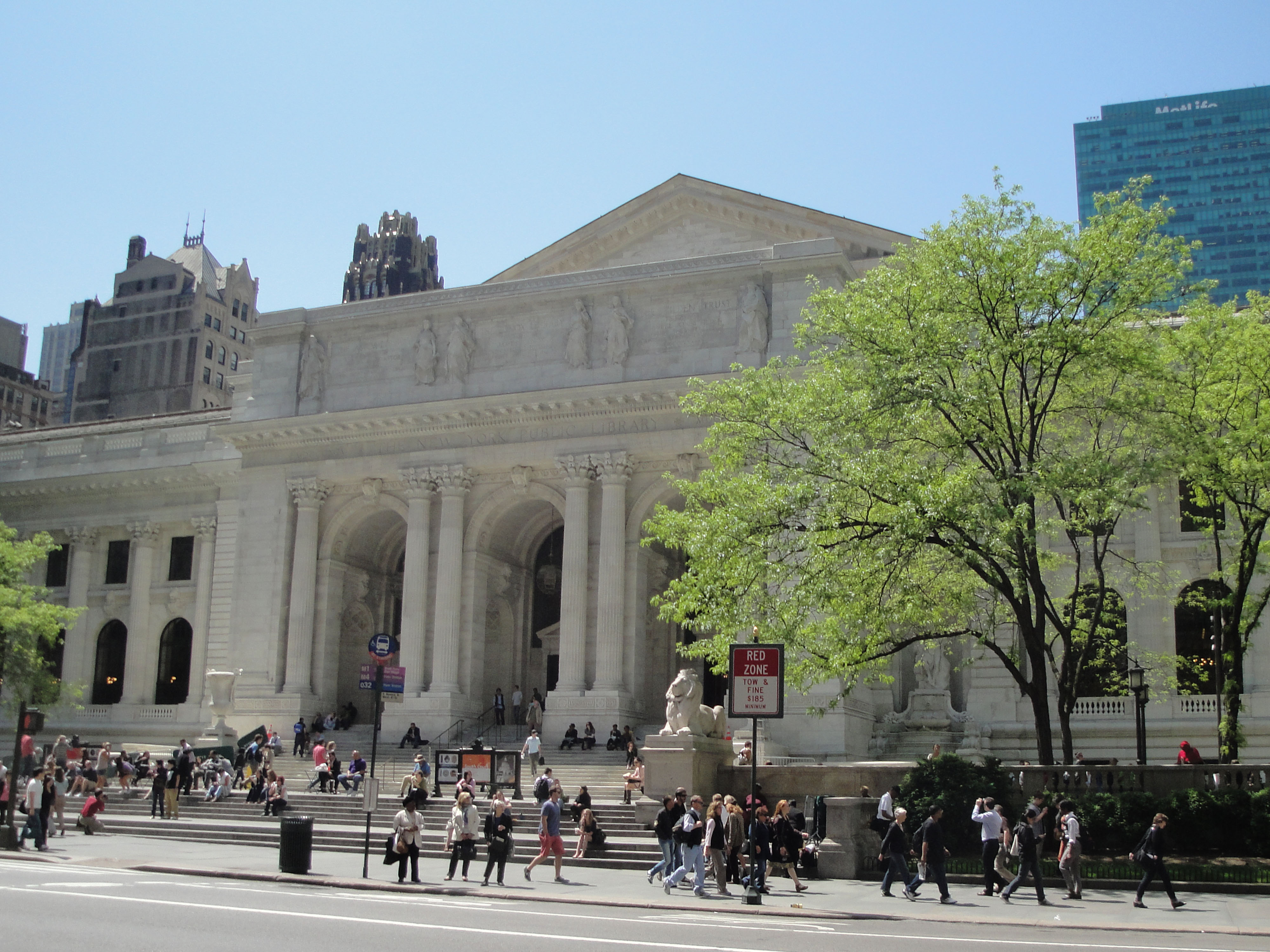
The band recorded their first full-length live album at the New York Public Library (as pictured)

Live at the New York Public Library

Live album by Harry and the Potters
- Released: June 2011
- Recorded: May 10, 2008 New York Public Library, New York City, New York
- Length: 44:51

Live at the New York Public Library is the first live album from wizard rock and indie rock band, Harry and the Potters. It was released in June 2011. Exclusively released as a long-playing vinyl record. Limited to 500 copies. It is also available as a digital download.

== Miscellaneous releases ==
=== Mail Songs #1 ===
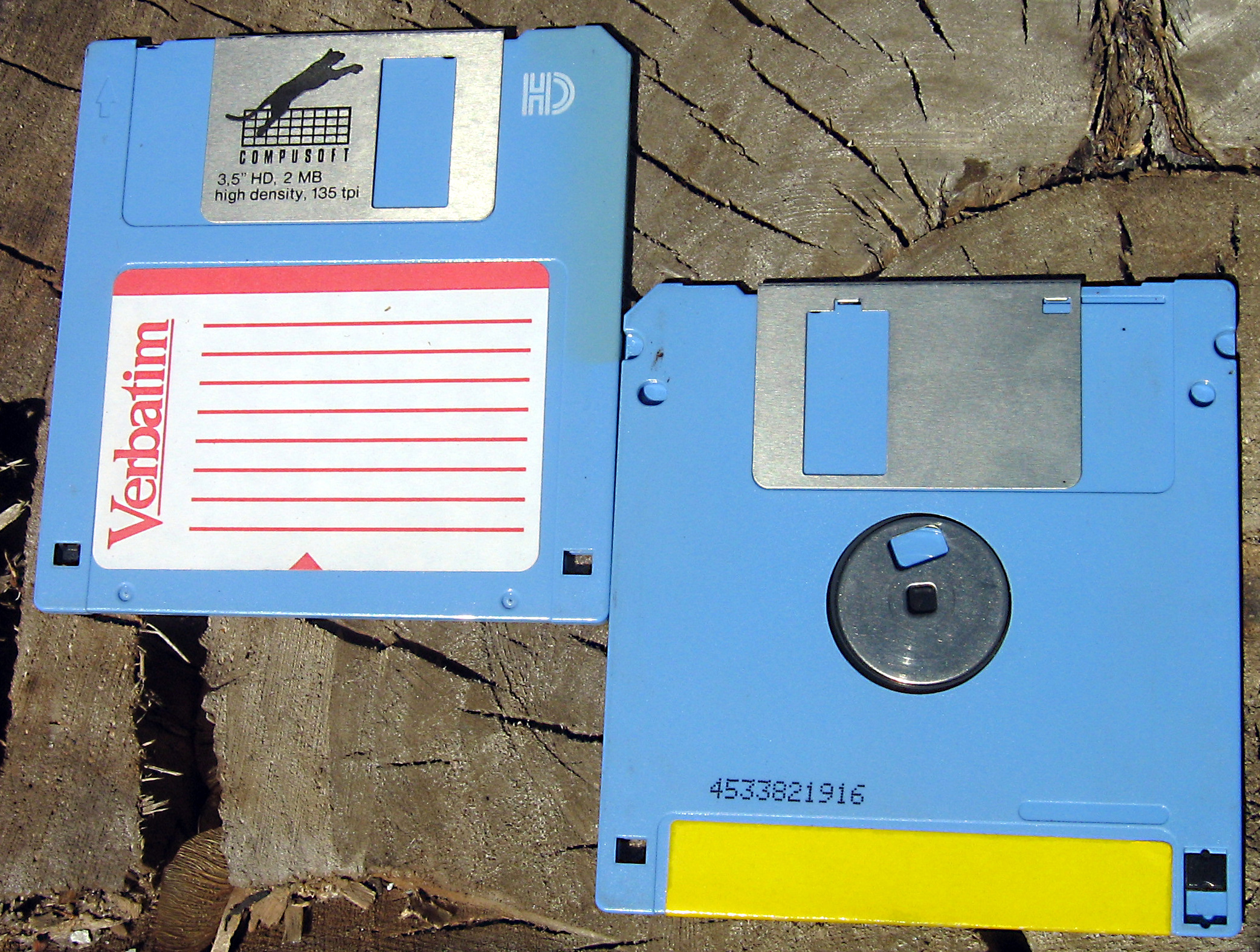
The band released Mail Songs #1 on 3½-inch floppy disk (as pictured)

Mail Songs #1 was released on 3½-inch floppy disk in October 2003. It was limited to 20-30 copies, all of which were sent to people who sent the band fanmail. Two songs, "Bertie Botts" and "Rocking at Hogwarts" were later released on Priori Incantatem. The version of "Diagon Alley" that appears of "Priori Incantatem" is a different version.

Track listing

No.	Title	Length
1.	"Mail Songs Intro"
2.	"Diagon Alley"
3.	"The Weasel"
4.	"Rocking at Hogwarts"
5.	"Bertie Botts"

=== Sonorus Cassette series ===
The Sonorus Cassette series was released on cassette on 31 August 2009. It is a series of live takes recorded onto seven cassettes. It was limited to 7 copies and it is out of print.

=== Mail Songs #2 ===
Mail Songs #2 was released on 3½-inch floppy disk on 22 April 2011. It was limited to 40 copies

== Side projects ==
=== Lemon Beat... The Beat ===
Lemon Beat... The Beat

EP by Dumbledore
- Released: December 2007
- Genre: Hip hop

Lemon Beat... The Beat is an extended play from the hip hop side project Dumbledore. It was released in a limited run of 1000 CDs as the Wizard Rock EP of the Month for December 2007.

Track listing

No.	Title	Length
1.	"Taking You 2 Skool"
2.	"D.Bowla"
3.	"U Down w/OOTP?"
4.	"WizardPartay2Nite"

=== Bob Dylan Sings the Songs of Harry and the Potters ===
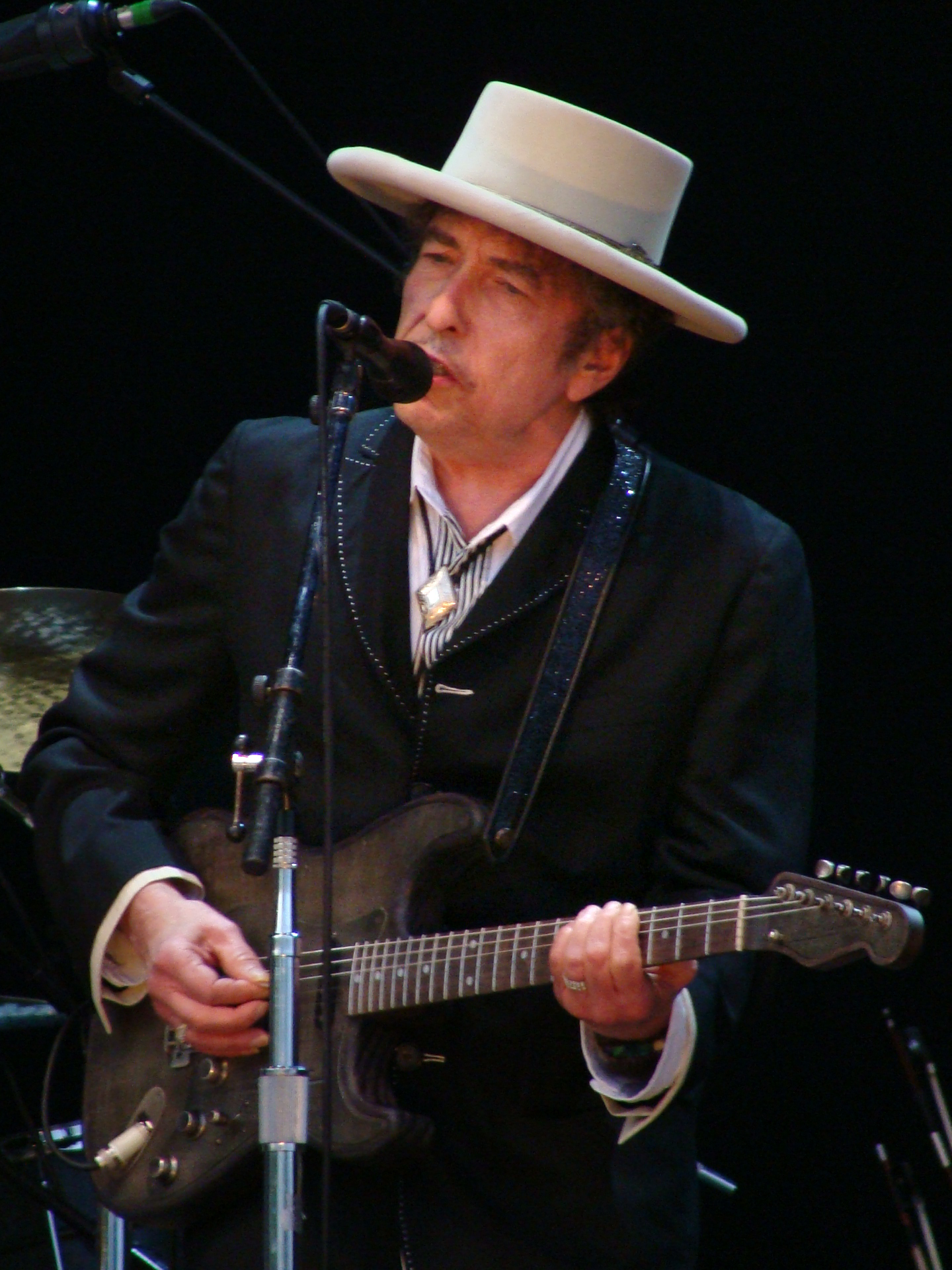
The EP's songs were humorously purported to have been recorded by Bob Dylan (pictured).

Sings the Songs of Harry and the Potters

EP by Bob Dylan
- Released: July 2009
- Genre: Tribute

Bob Dylan Sings the Songs of Harry and the Potters is an extended play, jokingly purported to be recordings of Harry and the Potters songs sung by Bob Dylan. It was released in a limited run of 1000 CDs as the Wizard Rock EP of the Month for July 2009.

Track listing

No.	Title	Length
1.	"Platform 9 and 3/4"
2.	"The Human Hosepipe"
3.	"Hagrid"
4.	"Save Ginny Weasley From Dean Thomas"
5.	"Felix Felicis"
6.	"In Which Draco Malfoy Cries Like a Baby"
7.	"Song for the Death Eaters"

== Other appearances ==
Year	Song	Album
2010	"Hermione's Favorite Food"	A New Hope: A Tribute to the Giant Squidstravaganza
