= Lumos =

Lumos may refer to:

- Lumos (charity), a charity founded by J.K. Rowling
- Lumos Networks, a fiber optic network service provider based in the United States
- A magic spell that makes light in the Harry Potter series; see Magic in Harry Potter
- Lumos (album), a 2019 album by Harry and the Potters
