= Harry and the Potters and the Power of Love =

Power of Love

Studio album by Harry and the Potters
- Released: July 4, 2006
- Recorded: February – June 2006
- Genres: Wizard rock, indie rock
- Length: 42:51
- Label: Eskimo Laboratories
- Producer: Harry and the Potters

Harry and the Potters chronology
Voldemort Can't Stop the Rock! (2004)	Power of Love (2006)	The Enchanted Ceiling (2007)

Harry and the Potters and the Power of Love, or Power of Love, is the third studio album by indie rock band Harry and the Potters, released on July 4, 2006. The album was primarily inspired by the sixth novel in the Harry Potter book series.

== Writing and recording ==
In early 2006, Harry and the Potters departed from their DIY home recording and sought a studio for their Scarred for Life EP. In the same year, they returned to home recording with the Power of Love but with a bigger sound and with the assistance recording veteran Kevin Micka. This time the band was joined by other musicians (including their sister, Cathy). Together, they recorded the album at an old house in Cambridge, MA called April Fog, the basement of Norwood High School, the DeGeorge family living room (also in Cambridge), and "at [an] old piano teacher's house."

When the recording sessions for the album were finished, the band had several songs that were left off of the final pressing, including "New Wizard Anthem (Club Mix)" and a new recording of "My Teacher is a Werewolf (Rock Version)," which had originally appeared on their second album. Paul DeGeorge explained that the band had wanted "New Wizard Anthem (Club Mix)" to be a hidden track in the pregap of the album, but the CD manufacturer was unable to do this, and thus it was left off the album. The two songs were later released on the compilation album Priori Incantatem.

== Promotion and reception ==
Critical reception to Harry and the Potters and the Power of Love has been mostly positive.

Melissa Anelli, the webmistress of the popular fansite The Leaky Cauldron, wrote positively about the album's most popular song, "Save Ginny Weasley from Dean Thomas," stating that "no show would be complete without a performance of it" and that "it's [Harry and the Potters] 'Free Bird'."

== Track listing ==
All tracks are written by Paul DeGeorge and Joe DeGeorge, except where noted.

No.	Title	Length
1.	"New Wizard Anthem"	1:50
2.	"Song for the Death Eaters"	4:32
3.	"Flesh, Blood, and Bone"	2:58
4.	"Save Ginny Weasley from Dean Thomas" (P. DeGeorge, J. DeGeorge, Dawn Riddle, Steve Gevurtz, Nicole J. Georges)	2:44
5.	"Felix Felicis"	1:39
6.	"Slug Club"	1:30
7.	"Smoochy Smoochy Pukey Pukey"	1:33
8.	"This Book Is So Awesome"	0:30
9.	"(Not Gonna Put On) The Monkey Suit"	2:37
10.	"We Save Ron's Life, Part 8"	2:24
11.	"Hermione's Birds and Boys"	1:09
12.	"In Which Draco Malfoy Cries Like a Baby"	2:19
13.	"Dumbledore"	6:14
14.	"Phoenix Song"	6:24
Total length:		42:51

== Personnel ==
=== Harry and the Potters ===
- Paul DeGeorge - Vocals, guitar, baritone saxophone and melodica
- Joe DeGeorge - Vocals, keyboard, tenor saxophone, glockenspiel and theremin

==== Studio musicians ====
- Ernie Kim - Drums, Gang vocals on "New Wizard Anthem"
- Brian Church - Bass
- Juliet Nelson - Cello on "Dumbledore" and "Phoenix Song"
- Jeanie Lee - Violin on "Dumbledore" and "Phoenix Song"
- Kevin Micka - Guitar Solo on "New Wizard Anthem", gang vocals on "New Wizard Anthem"
- Sean McCarthy - Audio feedback on "(Not Gonna Put On) The Monkey Suit"
- Catherine DeGeorge - Whistling on "In Which Draco Malfoy Cries Like a Baby"
- Devin King, Mike Gintz, Farhad Ebrahimi, Steeve Mike - Gang vocals

=== Production ===
Recorded at April Fog, Cambridge, MA, Norwood High School Basement, and DeGeorge Family Living Room, Norwood, MA

- Recorded by Kevin Micka
- Produced by Harry and the Potters

=== Artwork ===
- Design by Georg Pedersen
