= Voldemort =

Fictional character from Harry Potter

Lord Voldemort
- Harry Potter character
- Voldemort as illustrated by Mary GrandPré on the back cover of Harry Potter and the Deathly Hallows (left) and Ralph Fiennes as Lord Voldemort (Note: Harry Potter and the Deathly Hallows – Part 1 (2010)) (right)
- First appearance: Harry Potter and the Philosopher's Stone (1997)
- Created by: J. K. Rowling
- Portrayed by: Ralph Fiennes (Note: Goblet of Fire Order of the Phoenix Half-Blood Prince (archival footage) Deathly Hallows – Part 1 Deathly Hallows – Part 2); Ian Hart (Note: Philosopher's Stone); Richard Bremmer (Note: Philosopher's Stone (flashback)); Christian Coulson (Note: Chamber of Secrets (film) (teenager)); Hero Fiennes Tiffin (Note: Half-Blood Prince (child)); Frank Dillane (Note: Half-Blood Prince (teenager)); Billy Barratt (Note: Chamber of Secrets (TV series) (teenager))
- Voiced by: Eddie Izzard (Note: The Lego Batman Movie); Liam O'Brien (Note: Lego Dimensions); Matthew Macfadyen (Note: Full-cast audiobooks)

In-universe information
- Full name: Tom Marvolo Riddle
- Aliases: The Dark Lord; You-Know-Who; He-Who-Must-Not-Be-Named
- Gender: Male
- Family: Tom Riddle (father); Merope Gaunt (mother)
- Relatives: Thomas Riddle (paternal grandfather); Mary Riddle (paternal grandmother); Marvolo Gaunt (maternal grandfather); Morfin Gaunt (maternal uncle)
- Nationality: British
- House: Slytherin
- Born: 31 December 1926
- Died: 2 May 1998

Lord Voldemort (/ˈvoʊldəmɔːr/ VOHL-də-mor, /-mɔːrt/ -mort in the films) (Note: According to Rowling, the 't' in Voldemort is silent, as it is in the French word for 'death', mort (pronounced [mɔʁ]), and Jim Dale pronounced it as such in the first four U.S. audiobooks. After the release of the film version of Harry Potter and the Philosopher's Stone, where the characters pronounced the 't', Dale changed his audiobook pronunciation accordingly. Stephen Fry pronounced the name including the 't' for all the UK audiobooks.) is a fictional character and the main antagonist in the Harry Potter series of novels by J. K. Rowling. He first appears in Harry Potter and the Philosopher's Stone (1997) and returns either in person or in flashbacks in each novel in the series except the third, Harry Potter and the Prisoner of Azkaban, in which he is only mentioned.

Lord Voldemort—where "I am Lord Voldemort" is an anagrammatic sobriquet for his real name, Tom Marvolo Riddle—is the archenemy of Harry Potter, who according to a prophecy has "the power to vanquish the Dark Lord". After killing Harry's parents, Lily and James Potter, he attempts to murder the boy, but instead leaves him with a scar on his forehead in the shape of a lightning bolt. Nearly every witch or wizard dares not utter his name and refers to him instead with such monikers as "You-Know-Who", "He-Who-Must-Not-Be-Named", "The Dark Lord", or "Tom" by Dumbledore. Voldemort's obsession with blood purity signifies his aim to rid the wizarding world of Muggle (non-magical) heritage and to conquer both worlds, Muggle and wizarding, to achieve pure-blood dominance. Through his mother's family, he is the last descendant of the wizard Salazar Slytherin, one of the four founders of Hogwarts School of Witchcraft and Wizardry. He is the leader of the Death Eaters, a group of wizards and witches dedicated to ridding the Wizarding World of Muggles and establishing Voldemort as its supreme ruler.

== Character development ==
In a 1999 interview, Rowling claimed Voldemort was invented as a nemesis for Harry Potter, and she intentionally did not flesh out Voldemort's backstory at first. "The basic idea [was that Harry] didn't know he was a wizard ... And so then I kind of worked backwards from that position to find out how that could be, that he wouldn't know what he was. ... When he was one year old, the most evil wizard for hundreds and hundreds of years attempted to kill him. He killed Harry's parents, and then he tried to kill Harry—he tried to curse him. ... Harry has to find out, before we find out. And—so—but for some mysterious reason the curse didn't work on Harry. So he's left with this lightning bolt-shaped scar on his forehead and the curse rebounded upon the evil wizard, who has been in hiding ever since."

In the second book, Rowling establishes that Voldemort hates non-pure-blood wizards, despite being a half-blood himself. In a 2000 interview with the BBC, Rowling described Voldemort as a self-hating bully: "Well I think it is often the case that the biggest bullies take what they know to be their own defects, as they see it, and they put them right on someone else and then they try and destroy the other and that's what Voldemort does." In the same year, Rowling became more precise about Voldemort. She began to link him to real-life tyrants, describing him as "a raging psychopath, devoid of the normal human responses to other people's suffering". In 2004, though, Rowling said that she did not base Voldemort on any real person. In 2006, Rowling told an interviewer that Voldemort at his core has a human fear: the fear of death. She said: "Voldemort's fear is death, ignominious death. I mean, he regards death itself as ignominious. He thinks that it's a shameful human weakness, as you know. His worst fear is death."

Throughout the series, Rowling establishes that Voldemort is so feared in the wizarding world that it is considered dangerous even to speak his name. Most characters in the novels refer to him as "You-Know-Who" or "He-Who-Must-Not-Be-Named" rather than say his name aloud. In Harry Potter and the Deathly Hallows, a "taboo" spell is placed upon the name, such that Voldemort or his followers may trace anyone who utters it. By this means, his followers eventually find and capture Harry and his friends Ron Weasley and Hermione Granger. In the second book, Rowling reveals that I am Lord Voldemort is an anagram of the character's birth name, Tom Marvolo Riddle (in translated editions of the book, his middle name or entire birth name is/are often changed in order to allow anagrams to be formed in other languages).

According to the author, Voldemort's name is an invented word. The name Voldemort is derived from the French vol de mort which means "flight of death" or "theft of death".

== Appearances ==
=== Harry Potter and the Philosopher's Stone ===
Voldemort, voiced by Ian Hart, on the back of Professor Quirrell's head in Harry Potter and the Philosopher's Stone

Voldemort makes his debut in Harry Potter and the Philosopher's Stone. In this story, Rowling introduces him as the Dark Lord who tried to kill Harry Potter because the boy was prophesied to destroy him. Voldemort murdered Harry's parents, James and Lily, but as a result of his mother's love and willingness to sacrifice herself for him, baby Harry survived when Voldemort tried to murder him with a Killing Curse. Voldemort was disembodied, and Harry was left with a mysterious, lightning bolt-shaped scar on his forehead as a result.

In the book, Voldemort unsuccessfully tries to regain his dissolved body by stealing the titular Philosopher's Stone. To achieve his objective, Voldemort uses Professor Quirrell's aid by latching onto the back of the latter's head. However, at the climax of the book, Harry manages to prevent Voldemort from stealing the stone.

=== Harry Potter and the Chamber of Secrets ===
In the second installment, Harry Potter and the Chamber of Secrets, Rowling introduces Voldemort's true identity, former Hogwarts pupil and Slytherin prefect Tom Marvolo Riddle, who appears as a manifestation of the Dark Lord's teenage self that resides inside a magical diary found by Ginny Weasley. In this book, Ginny is written as a shy girl with a crush on Harry. Feeling anxious and lonely, she begins to write into the diary and shares her deepest fears with the sympathetic Tom. However, at the climax of the story, when the manifestation of Riddle rearranges the letters in his name to write "I am Lord Voldemort", it is revealed that Tom and the Dark Lord are just one person and that he is a descendant of one of the school's founders, Salazar Slytherin. Riddle states he has grown strong on Ginny's fears and eventually possesses her, using her as a pawn to unlock the Chamber of Secrets, whence a basilisk is set free and petrifies several Hogwarts students. Harry defeats the manifestation of Riddle from the diary and the basilisk. In Harry Potter and the Half-Blood Prince, Albus Dumbledore reveals to Harry that the diary was one of Voldemort's Horcruxes.

=== Harry Potter and the Prisoner of Azkaban ===
Voldemort does not appear in the third book, Harry Potter and the Prisoner of Azkaban, either in person or as a magical manifestation. He is, however, heard when Harry passes out from the harsh effects of a Dementor. Towards the end of the story, Sybill Trelawney, the Divination professor, makes a rare genuine prophecy: "The Dark Lord lies alone and friendless, abandoned by his followers. His servant has been chained these twelve years. Tonight, before midnight, the servant will break free and set out to rejoin his master. The Dark Lord will rise again with his servant's aid, greater and more terrible than ever before." The servant is eventually revealed to be Peter Pettigrew, who, for the 12 years since Voldemort's fall, has been disguised as Ron's pet rat, Scabbers.

=== Harry Potter and the Goblet of Fire ===
The Dark Mark, Voldemort's symbol

In Harry Potter and the Goblet of Fire (2000), Voldemort reappears at the start and the climax of the book. Rowling lets many seemingly unrelated plot elements fall into order. It is revealed that Voldemort's minion Barty Crouch Jr, disguised as Hogwarts professor Mad-Eye Moody, has manipulated the events of the Triwizard Tournament in Harry's favour. Voldemort's goal is to teleport Harry under Dumbledore's watch as a reluctant participant to the Little Hangleton graveyard, where the Riddle family is buried. Harry is captured and, after Pettigrew uses Harry's blood to fulfil a gruesome magical rite, Voldemort regains his body and is restored to his full power. For the first time in the series, Rowling describes his appearance: "tall and skeletally thin", with a face "whiter than a skull, with wide, livid scarlet eyes and a nose that was as flat as a snake's with slits for nostrils". Rowling writes that his "hands were like large, pale spiders; his long white fingers caressed his own chest, his arms, his face; the red eyes, whose pupils were slits, like a cat's, gleamed still more brightly through the darkness". It is revealed that with Pettigrew's help, Voldemort had created a small, rudimentary body, corporeal enough to travel and perform magic, and formulated a plan to restore his own body by capturing Harry. A portion of the plan had been overheard by Frank Bryce, a gardener, whom Voldemort then killed. Voldemort then completes his plan and returns to life in his full body as a result of the rite with Harry's blood. He then summons his Death Eaters to the graveyard to witness the death of Harry as he challenges Harry to a duel. However, when Voldemort duels Harry, their wands become magically locked together due to the twin phoenix feather cores of the wands. Because of a phenomenon later revealed as Priori Incantatem, ghost-like manifestations of Voldemort's most recent victims (including Harry's parents) then appear and distract Voldemort, allowing Harry just enough time to escape via Portkey with the body of fellow-student, Cedric Diggory, who was murdered by Pettigrew on Voldemort's orders.

=== Harry Potter and the Order of the Phoenix ===
Voldemort returns near the end of Harry Potter and the Order of the Phoenix (2003). He engineers a plot to free Bellatrix Lestrange and other Death Eaters from Azkaban and then embarks on a scheme to retrieve the full record of a prophecy stored in the Department of Mysteries regarding Harry and himself. He sends a group of Death Eaters to retrieve the prophecy, where the Order of the Phoenix meets them. All but Bellatrix are captured, and Voldemort engages in a ferocious duel with Dumbledore. When Dumbledore gets the upper hand, Voldemort attempts to possess Harry but finds that he cannot; Harry is too full of that which Voldemort finds incomprehensible, and which he detests as weakness: love. Sensing that Dumbledore could win, Voldemort disapparates, but not before the Minister for Magic sees him in person, making his return to life public knowledge in the next book.

=== Harry Potter and the Half-Blood Prince ===
Though Voldemort never physically appears in the sixth book, Harry Potter and the Half-Blood Prince (2005), his rise to power continues to unfold in the background. He murders Amelia Bones of the Department of Magical Law Enforcement and begins to target members of the Order of the Phoenix. In a series of flashbacks, it is revealed that Voldemort was the son of the witch Merope Gaunt and a Muggle named Tom Riddle. Riddle abandoned Merope before their child's birth, soon after which Merope died. After living in an orphanage, young Riddle met Dumbledore, who told him he was a wizard and arranged for him to attend Hogwarts. Riddle was outwardly a model student, but inwardly took sadistic pleasure in using his powers to harm and control people. He eventually murdered his father and grandparents as revenge for abandoning him. The book also discusses Riddle's hatred of Muggles, his obsession with Horcruxes, and his desire to split his soul to achieve immortality. Rowling stated that Voldemort's conception under the influence of a love potion symbolises the coercive circumstances under which he was brought into the world.

In the main plot of the book, Voldemort's next step is to engineer an assault on Hogwarts, and to kill Dumbledore. This is accomplished by Draco Malfoy, who arranges transportation of Death Eaters into Hogwarts by a pair of Vanishing Cabinets, which bypass the extensive protective enchantments placed around the school. The cabinets allow Voldemort's Death Eaters to enter Hogwarts, where battle commences and Dumbledore is cornered. Hogwarts professor (and re-doubled agent) Severus Snape uses the Killing Curse against Dumbledore when Draco could not force himself to do so.

=== Harry Potter and the Deathly Hallows ===
In Harry Potter and the Deathly Hallows (2007), Voldemort furthers his quest for ultimate power. He disposes of the Minister for Magic and replaces him with Pius Thicknesse, who is under the Imperius Curse. Establishing a totalitarian police state, he has Muggle-borns persecuted and arrested for "stealing magic" from the "pure blood" wizards. After failing to kill Harry with Draco's father Lucius Malfoy's borrowed wand (to avoid the effect of Priori Incantatem), he goes on a murderous search for the Elder Wand, the most powerful wand ever created, seeing it as the weapon he needs to overcome Harry's wand and make him truly invincible. His journey takes him to Nurmengard, the prison where Gellert Grindelwald is kept, and he kills Grindelwald as well. He finally locates the Elder Wand and steals it from Dumbledore's tomb.

Later, Voldemort finds out that Harry and his friends are hunting and destroying his Horcruxes when informed of their heist on the Lestranges' vault at Gringotts in search for Hufflepuff's Cup. After offering the occupants of Hogwarts mercy if they give up Harry, he assembles a large army and launches an invasion of the castle, where Harry is searching for Ravenclaw's Diadem. Voldemort orders his pet snake Nagini to execute Snape, believing it would make him the true master of the Elder Wand, since Snape killed Dumbledore. He then calls an hour's armistice, in exchange for Harry. When Harry willingly walks into Voldemort's camp in the Forbidden Forest, Voldemort strikes him down with the Elder Wand. However, the use of Harry's blood to resurrect Voldemort's body proves to be a major setback: while Harry's blood runs in Voldemort's veins, Harry cannot be killed as his mother's protection lives on now in Voldemort too. Instead, Voldemort unknowingly destroys the part of his own soul that resides in Harry's body.

Voldemort forces Rubeus Hagrid to carry Harry's apparently lifeless body back to the castle as a trophy, sparking another battle during which Nagini, his last Horcrux, is destroyed by Neville Longbottom. The battle then moves into the Great Hall, where Voldemort fights Minerva McGonagall, Kingsley Shacklebolt, and Horace Slughorn simultaneously. Harry then reveals himself and explains to Voldemort that Draco became the true master of the Elder Wand when he disarmed Dumbledore; Harry, in turn, won the wand's allegiance when he took Draco's wand.

Refusing to believe this, Voldemort casts the Killing Curse with the Elder Wand while Harry uses a Disarming Charm with Draco's, but the Elder Wand refuses to kill its master and the spell rebounds on Voldemort who, with all of his Horcruxes destroyed, finally dies.

Rowling stated that after his death, Voldemort is forced to exist in the stunted infant-like form that Harry sees in the King's Cross-like limbo after his confrontation with Voldemort in the Forbidden Forest. Rowling also mentioned that, despite his extreme fear of death, he cannot become a ghost.

== Portrayal in films ==
Young Tom in his fifth year at Hogwarts as played by Christian Coulson in Harry Potter and the Chamber of Secrets.

Voldemort appears in every Harry Potter film, with the exception of Harry Potter and the Prisoner of Azkaban. Several actors have portrayed him in his varying incarnations and ages.

In Harry Potter and the Philosopher's Stone, Voldemort's manifestation is as a face on the back of Quirrell's head, an effect achieved by computer-generated imagery. Ian Hart, the actor who played Quirrell in the same film, provided the voice and the facial source for this character. Voldemort also appears in a scene in the Forbidden Forest where he is seen drinking the blood of a unicorn. As Voldemort's face was altered enough by CG work, and Hart's voice was affected enough, there was no confusion by Hart's playing of the two roles. In that film, he was also shown in a flashback sequence when he arrived at the home of James and Lily Potter to kill them. In this scene Voldemort is played by Richard Bremmer, though his face is never seen. His next appearance would be in Harry Potter and the Chamber of Secrets as the 16-year-old Tom Marvolo Riddle (portrayed by Christian Coulson).

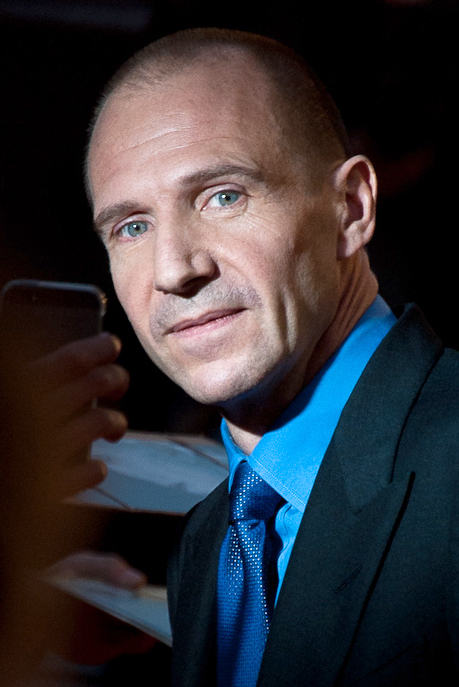
Ralph Fiennes portrays Voldemort from Goblet of Fire to Deathly Hallows Part 2.

In Harry Potter and the Goblet of Fire, Voldemort is initially only heard, possessing the scratchy, weak voice heard in the first film. By the film's climax, however, he appears in his physical form for the first time, played by Ralph Fiennes. As in the book, Voldemort is shown clad in dark black robes, being tall and emaciated, with no hair and yellowish teeth; his wand has a white tone, and the handle appears to be made of bone; his fingernails are long and pale blue while his toenails appear to be infected. Unlike in the book, his pupils are not cat-like, and his eyes are blue, because producer David Heyman felt that his evil would not be able to be seen and would not fill the audience with fear (his eyes do briefly take on a snake-like appearance when he opens them after turning human, but quickly turn normal). As in the book, the film version of Voldemort has snake-like slit nostrils with the flesh of his nose significantly pressed back. Ralph Fiennes's nose was not covered in makeup on the set but was digitally removed in post-production. In this first appearance, Voldemort also has a forked tongue, but this element was removed for the subsequent films.

Fiennes stated that he had two weeks to shoot the climactic showdown scene where he is gloating over a terrified Harry, played by Daniel Radcliffe. Fiennes said with a chuckle: "I have no doubt children will be afraid of me now if they weren't before." In preparation, he read the novel Goblet of Fire, but jokingly conceded: "I was only interested in my scene, and I had to go through thousands and thousands of other scenes which I did, dutifully, until I got to my scene and I read it many, many, many, many, many times and that was my research." Fiennes reprised his role as Voldemort in Harry Potter and the Order of the Phoenix and Harry Potter and the Deathly Hallows – Part 1 and Part 2.

Fiennes's nephew, Hero Fiennes Tiffin, portrayed Tom Riddle as a child in Harry Potter and the Half-Blood Prince. By the time filming arrived Christian Coulson was 29, and not considered suitable to return as the adolescent Riddle. Thomas James Longley was originally scheduled to take over the role, but last minute renegotiations saw Frank Dillane cast instead.

== Stage adaptation ==
In the 2016 stage play Harry Potter and the Cursed Child, it is revealed that Bellatrix gave birth to Voldemort's daughter Delphi before the Battle of Hogwarts. Twenty-two years later, Delphi poses as Cedric's cousin and manipulates Harry and Ginny's second son Albus Severus Potter and his friend, Draco and Astoria Greengrass's son Scorpius Malfoy, into stealing a prototype Time Turner with which she hopes to resurrect her father. Using the Time Turner, Scorpius accidentally creates an alternative timeline where Voldemort killed Harry at the battle and now rules the wizarding world. In an attempt to achieve this future, Delphi travels to Godric's Hollow on the night Voldemort killed Harry's parents, hoping to avert the prophecy that led to her father's downfall. After receiving a message from his son, Harry, together with Ron, Hermione and Draco (who by now has become friends with Harry after they join forces to save their respective sons) transfigures himself into Voldemort so that he can distract Delphi, allowing them to overpower her. The real Voldemort kills Harry's parents as prophesied, and Delphi is sent to Azkaban.

== Characterisation ==
=== Outward appearance ===
After he regains his body in the fourth book, Rowling describes Voldemort as having pale skin, a chalk-white, skull-like face, snake-like slits for nostrils, red eyes and cat-like slits for pupils, a skeletally thin body and long, thin hands with unnaturally long fingers. As mentioned in the first chapter of the seventh book, he also has no hair or lips. Earlier in life, as seen through flashbacks contained in the second and sixth books, Tom Marvolo Riddle was handsome and tall with pale skin, jet black hair, and dark brown eyes. He could charm many people with his looks. The transformation into his monstrous state is believed to have been the result of creating his Horcruxes and becoming less human as he continued to divide his soul. In the films, Voldemort's eyes are blue with round pupils, as the decision was made not to have his portrayer, Ralph Fiennes, wear colored contact lenses.

=== Personality ===
Rowling described Voldemort as "the most evil wizard for hundreds and hundreds of years". She elaborated that he is a "raging psychopath, devoid of the normal human responses to other people's suffering", and whose only ambition in life is to become all-powerful and immortal. He is also a sadist who hurts and murders people—especially Muggles—for his own amusement. He has no conscience, feels no remorse or empathy, and does not recognise the worth and humanity of anybody except himself. He feels no need for human companionship or friendship, and cannot comprehend love or affection for another. He believes he is superior to everyone around him, to the point that he frequently refers to himself in the third person as "Lord Voldemort". Rowling also stated that Voldemort is "incredibly power hungry. Racist, really", and that if Voldemort were to look into the Mirror of Erised, in which one sees one's greatest desire, he would see "Himself, all-powerful and eternal. That's what he wants."

Rowling also stated that Voldemort's conception by influence of Amortentia—a love potion administered by his mother, a witch named Merope Gaunt, to the Muggle Tom Riddle—is related to his inability to understand love; it is "a symbolic way of showing that he came from a loveless union—but of course, everything would have changed if Merope had survived and raised him herself and loved him. The enchantment under which Tom Riddle fathered Voldemort is important because it shows coercion, and there can't be many more prejudicial ways to enter the world than as the result of such a union".

Like most archetypical villains, Voldemort's arrogance leads to his downfall. He also suffers from a pathological fear of death, which he regards as a shameful and ignominious human weakness. According to Rowling, his Boggart would be his own corpse. Rowling also said that the difference between Harry and Voldemort is that Harry accepts mortality, and thus Harry is, in the end, stronger than his nemesis.

=== Magical abilities and skills ===
Rowling establishes Voldemort throughout the series as an extremely powerful, intelligent, and ruthless dark wizard, described as the greatest and most powerful Dark Wizard of all time. He is known as one of the greatest Legilimens in the world and a highly accomplished Occlumens; he can read minds and shield his own from penetration. Besides Dumbledore, he is also the only wizard ever known to be able to apparate silently. Voldemort was also said to fear one wizard alone, Dumbledore.

In the final book, Voldemort flies unsupported, something that amazes those who see it. Voldemort, like his ancestral family, the Gaunts, is a Parselmouth, meaning he can converse with serpents. This skill was inherited from his ancestor, Salazar Slytherin. The Gaunt family speak Parseltongue among themselves. This highly unusual trait may be preserved through inbreeding, a practice employed by the Gaunt Family to maintain their blood's purity. When Voldemort attempts to kill Harry his ability to speak Parseltongue is passed to Harry through the small bit of the former's soul. After that bit of soul is destroyed, Harry loses this ability. In a flashback in the sixth novel, Voldemort boasts to Dumbledore during a job interview that he has "pushed the boundaries of magic farther than they had ever before". Dumbledore states that Voldemort's knowledge of magic is more extensive than any wizard alive and that even Dumbledore's most powerful protective spells and charms would likely be insufficient if Voldemort returned to full power. Dumbledore also said that Voldemort was probably the most brilliant student Hogwarts has ever seen. Although Voldemort remains highly accomplished and prodigious in skill, he is enormously lacking and highly inept in the most powerful magic, love. This inability to love and trust others proves to be Voldemort's greatest weakness in the series. Voldemort initially voices scepticism that his own magic might not be the most powerful, but upon returning to power, he admits to his Death Eaters that he had overlooked the ancient and powerful magic which Lily Potter invoked and that would protect Harry from harm.

On her website, Rowling wrote that Voldemort's wand is made of yew, whose sap is poisonous, and which symbolises death. It forms a deliberate contrast to Harry's wand, which is made of holly, which she chose because holly is alleged to repel evil.

Rowling establishes in the books that Voldemort is magically connected to Harry via Harry's forehead scar. He disembodies himself when his Killing Curse targeting Harry rebounds on him, leaving the scar on Harry's forehead. In the books, and to a lesser extent in the films, Harry's scar serves as an indicator of Voldemort's presence: it burns when the Dark Lord is near or when Voldemort is feeling murderous or exultant. According to Rowling, by attacking Harry when he was a baby Voldemort gave him "tools [that] no other wizard possessed—the scar and the ability it conferred, a magical window into Voldemort's mind".

=== Family ===
Voldemort was born Tom Marvolo Riddle on 31 December 1926. His mother Merope died in childbirth, leaving the baby to grow up alone in an orphanage. In Harry Potter and the Goblet of Fire, it is revealed that Voldemort murdered his father and grandparents, leaving himself the only surviving member of the Riddle family.

==== House of Gaunt ====
Most of the exposition of the House of Gaunt's background occurs in Harry Potter and the Half-Blood Prince, through the medium of Dumbledore's Pensieve. The Gaunts were once a powerful and influential family, and are the last known descendants of Salazar Slytherin. However, a vein of mental instability and violence within the family, reinforced through cousin marriages intended to preserve the pureblood line, had reduced them to poverty and squalor, as shown in the Pensieve's "memory" that Harry and Dumbledore witnessed. Like Salazar Slytherin, the Gaunts spoke Parseltongue. At the time of the story, the Gaunts' only material asset is a ramshackle shanty in Little Hangleton, that stood in a thicket in a valley opposite the Riddle House. Like the Riddles, the Gaunts were also unpopular with the local residents, with a reputation for being vulgar and intimidating.

Marvolo Gaunt was the last family patriarch. He was sentenced to a short term in Azkaban for his and his son's assault upon a Ministry of Magic official; this affected his health and he died soon after returning home. His signet ring passed to his son, Morfin Gaunt, who was convicted of assaulting a Muggle, and later died in Azkaban, convicted this time as a party to the murder of Tom Riddle Sr and Riddle's parents.

Dumbledore discovers the real culprit while visiting Morfin in Azkaban to gather information about Voldemort. After Dumbledore successfully extracts Morfin's memory of his encounter with his nephew, he tries to use the evidence to have Morfin released, but Morfin dies before the decision can be made. The House of Gaunt ended with Morfin's death.

Merope Gaunt (/məˈroʊpi/) was the daughter of Marvolo, and sister of Morfin. Harry's first impression of her was that she looked "like the most defeated person he had ever seen". She married Tom Riddle Sr and became pregnant within three months of the wedding. It is suggested that she tricked her husband into loving her by using a love potion, but sometime during her pregnancy, chose to stop administering the potion. It is implied that Merope had grown tired of living the lie and thought that her husband might have grown to love her, or that he might have stayed for the sake of their unborn child; however, he left her. Desperate, Merope wandered through the streets of London. The only thing she had left was the heavy gold locket that had once belonged to Salazar Slytherin, one of her family's most treasured items, which she sold for a small amount. When she was due to give birth, she stumbled into a Muggle orphanage, where she gave birth to her only son. She died within the next hour.

== Reception ==
Several people have drawn a parallel between Voldemort and some politicians. Rowling has said that Voldemort was "a sort of" Adolf Hitler, and that there is some parallel with Nazism in her books. Rowling also compared Voldemort to Joseph Stalin. Alfonso Cuarón, director of Harry Potter and the Prisoner of Azkaban, compared Voldemort to George W. Bush and Saddam Hussein, who he said "have selfish interests and are very much in love with power. Also, a disregard for the environment. A love for manipulating people." Andrew Slack and the Harry Potter Alliance compare media consolidation in the US to Voldemort's regime in Deathly Hallows and its control over the Daily Prophet and other media, saying, "Once Voldemort took over every form of media in the wizarding world, Dumbledore's Army and the Order of the Phoenix formed an independent media movement called 'Potterwatch'. Now the HP Alliance and Wizard Rock have come together to fight for a Potterwatch movement in the real world to fight back against Big VoldeMedia from further pushing out local and foreign news, minority representation, and the right to a Free Press." Julia Turner of Slate Magazine also noted similarities between the events of Harry Potter and the Half-Blood Prince and the war on terror. She said that Voldemort commits acts of terrorism such as destroying bridges, murdering innocents, and forcing children to kill their elders. Rowling compared Voldemort to Donald Trump during his 2016 presidential campaign.

Voldemort has also been compared to other fictional characters, such as Sauron from The Lord of the Rings, as both villains, during the main plot of those series, seek to recover their lost power after having been considered dead or neutralized as a threat, and are also so feared that they are sometimes unnamed.

The entertainment website IGN listed Voldemort as the seventh best Harry Potter character, calling him "truly frightening".

== In popular culture ==
Several campaigns have used Voldemort to compare his evil to the influence of politicians, large media and corporations. "Lord Voldemort" is a nickname sometimes used for Peter Mandelson. Voldemort is also a recurring theme among wizard rock bands. Voldemort Can't Stop the Rock! is the second album from Harry and the Potters, and the character is mentioned in songs such as "The Dark Lord Lament" and "Flesh, Blood, and Bone".

Voldemort also appears in The Potter Puppet Pals sketches by Neil Cicierega. One of the episodes including him was the seventeenth most viewed video of all time as of 2008 and the winner for "Best Comedy" of the year 2007 at YouTube.

"Continuing the Magic", an article in the 21 May 2007 issue of Time, includes mock book covers designed by author Lon Tweeten, laced with pop culture references. One of them, the "Dark Lord of the Dance", shows Voldemort teaming up with Harry on Broadway. In the Mad magazine parodies of the films, the character is called Lord Druckermort, a backwards reference to the magazine's longtime caricaturist Mort Drucker. In Alan Moore's League of Extraordinary Gentlemen: 1969, a young Tom Marvolo Riddle (introduced as "Tom", whose middle name is a "marvel" and last name is a "conundrum") appears, and becomes the new avatar of Oliver Haddo at the story's conclusion. In A Very Potter Musical, Voldemort is played by actor Joe Walker.

In 2011, Voldemort was one of eight British magical figures, which included characters from Arthurian legend, The Chronicles of Narnia, and Discworld, commemorated on a series of UK postage stamps issued by the Royal Mail.

In a segment celebrating British children's literature at the 2012 Summer Olympics opening ceremony in London, an inflatable Voldemort appeared alongside other villains, The Queen of Hearts, Captain Hook, and Cruella de Vil, to haunt children's dreams, before the arrival of a group of over thirty Mary Poppins who descended with their umbrellas to defeat them.

In 2015, British activist Maajid Nawaz used and popularized the term Voldemort effect to describe the inability to name, shame and isolate Islamist extremism from the moderate Muslim community.

During the 2016 United States elections, Daniel Radcliffe was asked by Sky News journalist Craig Dillon if he would compare Donald Trump to Lord Voldemort; Radcliffe responded, "Trump is worse".

Voldemort appears in The Lego Batman Movie as one of the prisoners in the Phantom Zone that Joker recruits to take over Gotham City. Though Ralph Fiennes is featured in this movie as the voice of the British butler Alfred Pennyworth, he does not reprise his role as Voldemort. Instead, Voldemort is voiced by Eddie Izzard.

Outside of the Harry Potter video games, Voldemort is also a playable character in Lego Dimensions, with archive audio of Fiennes' portrayal in the films used for his voiceovers.

A 2018 Italian fan film titled Voldemort: Origins of the Heir depicts the story of Tom Riddle's rise to power.

Voldemort appears in Space Jam: A New Legacy, in the crowd for the game between the Tune Squad and the Goon Squad.

An upcoming French fan-made short-film titled The House of Gaunt - Lord Voldemort Origins explores the origin story of Voldemort and The Gaunt family.

In the Breaking Bad spinoff Better Call Saul, Saul Goodman, speaking to Mike Ehrmantraut, nicknames the drug lord Gus Fring 'He Who Shall Not Be Named' in reference to Voldemort.

In May 2022, senior Australian Labor Party MP Tanya Plibersek compared former defence minister Peter Dutton from the Liberal Party of Australia to Voldemort. During a discussion about Dutton's prospects of becoming Liberal Party leader on Brisbane radio station 4BC, she said: "I think there will be a lot of children who have watched a lot of Harry Potter films who will be very frightened of what they are seeing on TV at night, that's for sure... I am saying he looks a bit like Voldemort and we will see whether he can do what he promised he would do when he was last running for leader which is smile more." A spokesperson from Plibersek's office said that she had reached out to Dutton soon after the interview to offer an unreserved apology and to say that she should have not made the remark. Labor Party leader, prime minister Anthony Albanese said Pilbersek's comments were "not acceptable" and that she had done the right thing in offering an apology. Dutton confirmed Plibersek had apologised. In response, Dutton said that while the comments were unfortunate, they were "water off a duck's back." He said that he realised that he was "not the prettiest bloke on the block" and said that he was bald due to being diagnosed with a skin condition.
