= Harry and the Potters (album) =

Studio album by Harry and the Potters
- Released: June 2003
- Recorded: April–May 2003 at the DeGeorge family living room, Norwood, Massachusetts
- Genre: Wizard rock, indie rock
- Length: 38:27
- Label: Eskimo Laboratories
- Producer: Joe and Paul DeGeorge

Harry and the Potters chronology
Harry and the Potters (2003)	Voldemort Can't Stop the Rock! (2004)

Harry and the Potters is the debut studio album by indie rock band Harry and the Potters, released in June 2003. The album was inspired by the first four novels in the Harry Potter book series.

== Background ==
The origin of Harry and the Potters is rooted in accident. After reading the Harry Potter books, Paul DeGeorge formulated the premise for Harry and the Potters where the principle Harry Potter characters would be the musicians: Harry as the front man, Ron on guitar, Hermione on bass and Hagrid on drums. Then a crisis of sorts struck the brothers on June 22, 2002. During a barbecue at the DeGeorge family's Norwood Massachusetts home, Joe organized a concert in his backyard featuring his band Ed and the Refridgerators [sic], his brother's band The Secrets, and Soltero. However, the latter two bands canceled the day of the event.

To rescue a nearly lost opportunity, while waiting hopefully for a band to show, Harry and the Potters came into existence over the next hour when the two brothers wrote seven Potter-themed songs. They performed that first concert as Harry and the Potters for six people who remained of their audience. Of the seven songs written that day, five—viz. "I Am a Wizard", "Wizard Chess", "Platform 9 and ¾", "Diagon Alley", and "Problem Solving Skillz"—were to make it onto the band's first album in 2003 (a song about the wizarding sport Quidditch and "The Troll Song" were left off the album, and neither song has ever been officially released).

== Writing and recording ==
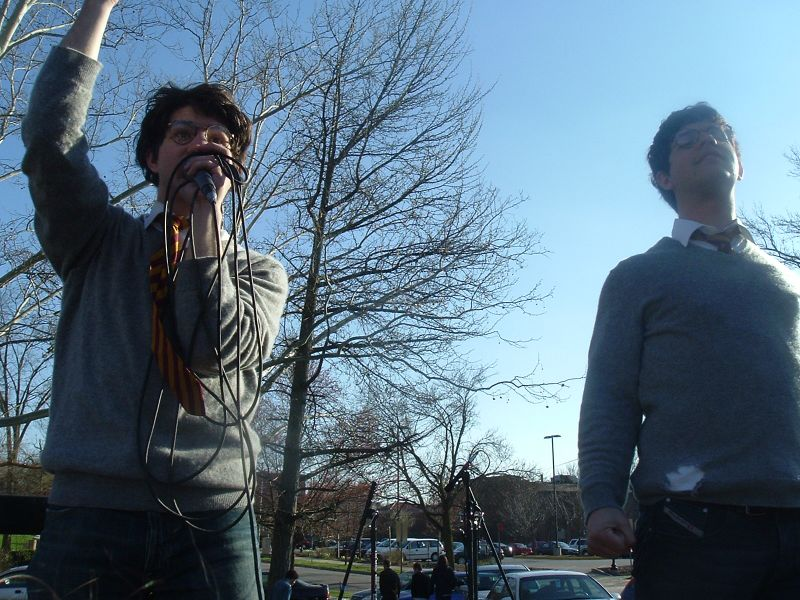
The album was written and recorded by the brothers Joe (left) and Paul DeGeorige (right) (pictured in 2006).

After the makeshift show at the DeGeorge's backyard, Paul and Joe had the idea that they might be able to perform at other venues. When they began to write songs for prospective shows, they decided to also record their music and release an album. In April 2003, the brothers consequently began working on their debut album, Harry and the Potters, which was recorded and produced by Harry and the Potters in 2003 under the Eskimo Laboratories record label, at the DeGeorge family's living room in Massachusetts. According to Melissa Anelli, Paul wrote the majority of the instrumental tracks on his Casio keyboard, whereas Joe conceptualized most of the vocal tracks.

The brothers split songwriting responsibilities between the two of them: Joe was responsible for songs dealing with Harry Potter and the Prisoner of Azkaban (1999), whereas Paul was responsible for songs dealing with Harry Potter and the Chamber of Secrets (1998). According to Paul DeGeorge, "We were pretty much writing songs and then recording them on the spot". This statement emphasizes the band's do-it-yourself amateurishness as an essential aspect of the album. Initially, the band recorded their songs without using drums, but at the last minute decided that they wanted to have drums on the album. Thus, they called on their friend Ernie Kim for assistance, and he overdubbed drum parts onto most of the songs.

In recording Harry and the Potters, the band aimed to release the album shortly before the fifth book in the Harry Potter series, Harry Potter and the Order of the Phoenix (2003) was released. According to Paul, "We were in a rush to get that stuff done before the 5th book release" and this instinct supports claims it took only two weekends to record the album. He went on to say "it's kind of cool because it serves as a document and really captures the moment". Despite the band's purported rush to finish the album, Paul and Joe worked particularly hard on the song "These Days are Dark."

When the recording sessions for the album were finished, the band had twenty songs for an album. However, the songs "Diagon Alley" and "The Wrath of Hermione" were left off. The two were later released on the Harry and the Potters compilation album Priori Incantatem (2009). Paul DeGeorge explained that the former was left off because the band felt they had enough short songs on their debut, and the latter was omitted because the DeGeorge brothers found it annoying, although it was played live.

== Promotion and reception ==
Paul DeGeorge used $1,200 of his own money to finance the pressing of the CDs. The band also started silk-screening about two hundred T-shirts with the help of friends. In order to publicize the release, Harry and the Potters decided to undertake a summer tour performing at libraries through the publicity from the highly anticipated release of Harry Potter and the Order of the Phoenix. On June 21, 2003, the band played five sets in a span of 24 hours.

Professional ratings
Review scores
Source	Rating
Sputnikmusic	(3.3/5)

Critical reception to Harry and the Potters has been, for the most part, positive, with many reviewers praising the bands lo-fi sound and album production. Before the release of the album, Harry and the Potters had already made minor headlines in the news, thanks to their quirky appearance and their energetic lives shows. However, a year after releasing their debut album, in the spring of 2004, the Barnard Bulletin, a student news magazine of Barnard College, printed one of the earliest reviews of their music. Until then, it had been the stage persona of the band that drew media attention. The student reviewer said that, "The best thing about Harry and the Potters is not how silly the whole concept is or the faithfully accurate retelling of the books but how very bad the band is." The review was tongue-in-cheek and emphasized the do-it-yourself (DIY) amateurishness as an essential part of the group's "reading, rocking, all ages" vision.

== Track listing ==
All tracks are written by Paul DeGeorge, Joe DeGeorge and Ernie Kim.

No.	Title	Length
1.	"I am a Wizard"	2:34
2.	"Platform 9 and ¾"	1:04
3.	"The Dark Lord Lament"	2:02
4.	"Fluffy"	0:17
5.	"Wizard Chess"	1:26
6.	"Problem Solving Skillz"	1:43
7.	"Back to School"	1:22
8.	"The Foil (Malfoy)"	1:35
9.	"Follow the Spiders"	1:34
10.	"Save Ginny Weasley"	3:02
11.	"2 Weeks to Myself"	3:10
12.	"Gryffindor Rocks"	1:36
13.	"The Firebolt"	1:26
14.	"My Teacher is a Werewolf"	0:36
15.	"The Godfather"	2:37
16.	"The Fourth Triwizard Champion"	2:14
17.	"The Yule Ball"	2:25
18.	"These Days are Dark"	5:27
Total length:		38:27

== Personnel ==
Harry and the Potters

- Paul DeGeorge – vocals, guitar, baritone saxophone, melodica
- Joe DeGeorge – vocals, keyboard, tenor saxophone, glockenspiel, theremin

Additional personnel

- Ernie Kim – drums
- Georg Pedersen – artwork design
