= Lumos (album) =

Studio album by Harry and the Potters
- Released: June 21, 2019
- Recorded: 2018
- Studios: Bang-a-Song Studios (Gloucester, MA); Lawrence, Kansas Public Library
- Genres: Wizard rock, indie rock
- Length: 57:18
- Label: Eskimo Laboratories
- Producer: Harry and the Potters

Harry and the Potters chronology
Live at the New York Public Library (2011)	Lumos (2019)

Lumos is the fourth studio album by indie rock band Harry and the Potters, released on June 21, 2019. The album is composed of songs inspired by the seventh novel in the Harry Potter book series.

== Writing and recording ==
At a live show on March 30, 2018, Harry and the Potters debuted new material, which they announced would be included on a new studio album focused on The Deathly Hallows. Soon thereafter, Brad Mehlenbacher, the drummer and guitarist for the wizard rock band Draco and the Malfoys, confirmed that he helped the DeGeorge brothers arrange the songs, and that he would also be playing drums on the new record.

The DeGeorges later announced that the album would also feature the anti-folk musician Kimya Dawson as a guest vocalist. Dawson's parts were recorded at the Lawrence, Kansas public library. The majority of the album was recorded at Bang-a-Song Studios in Gloucester, MA, making it their first full-length album to be recorded in a professional studio.

A demo of "The Banality of Evil (Song for Albert Runcorn)" was released on September 1, 2018 as part of that year's "Wizard Rock Sampler".

== Promotion and release ==
On April 23, 2019, the band unveiled a Kickstarter to help recoup the cost of recording the album, which they revealed was named Lumos. Backers could also choose rewards that included an additional album entitled Mostly Camping, as well as a vinyl single featuring the short song "Harry Potter Boogie."

== Track list ==
All tracks are written by Joe and Paul DeGeorge.

1. "Lumos" – 2:48
2. "You're Not the Wizard" – 3:04
3. "Good Riddance (Privet Drive)" – 2:57
4. "The Trace" – 2:24
5. "On the Importance of Media Literacy Under Authoritarian Rule" – 2:56
6. "Hermione's Army" – 4:34
7. "What Happened to the Cat?" – 1:35
8. "The Banality of Evil (Song for Albert Runcorn)" – 2:17
9. "Gone Campin'" – 4:17
10. "Where's Ron?" (feat. Kimya Dawson) – 4:04
11. "No Pureblood Supremacy" – 3:28
12. "Voldemort in Your Head" – 1:55
13. "The Sword, the Cup, and the Dragon" – 4:39
14. "The Cloak" – 2:29
15. "The Stone" – 9:30
16. "The Wand" – 4:15

== Personnel ==
=== Harry and the Potters ===
- Paul DeGeorge – vocals, guitar, baritone saxophone and melodica
- Joe DeGeorge – vocals, keyboard, tenor saxophone, glockenspiel and theremin

==== Studio musicians ====
- Brad Mehlenbacher – drums
- Kimya Dawson – vocals on "Where's Ron"

Others

- Andrew Huang - "Dragon" on "The Sword, the Cup, and the Dragon"

=== Production ===
Recorded at Bang-a-Song Studios and the Lawrence, Kansas Public Library

- Engineered by Warren Babson and Tony Goddess
- Produced by Harry and the Potters

=== Artwork ===
- Design by Dan McCarthy
