= Voldemort: Origins of the Heir =

2018 fantasy film

- Promotional poster
- Directed by: Gianmaria Pezzato
- Screenplay by: Gianmaria Pezzato
- Based on: Characters and Harry Potter by J. K. Rowling
- Produced by: Stefano Prestia
- Starring: Stefano Rossi; Davide Ellena; Andrea Baglio; Andrea Deanesi; Aurora Moroni; Maddalena Orcali; Andrea Bonfanti; Gelsomina Bassetti; Alessio Dalla Costa
- Cinematography: Michele Purin
- Edited by: Gianmaria Pezzato
- Music by: Matthew Steed; Stefano Prestia
- Production company: Tryangle Films
- Release date: 13 January 2018
- Running time: 53 minutes
- Country: Italy
- Language: English
- Budget: €15,000

Voldemort: Origins of the Heir is an English-language Italian fantasy film directed by Gianmaria Pezzato and with Stefano Prestia as executive producer. It is an unofficial fan-made prequel to the Harry Potter film series. Voldemort: Origins of the Heir depicts the story of Tom Riddle's rise to power as a dark wizard and main antagonist in the Harry Potter saga. Several original characters are introduced in the film: not only the protagonist, but also the other Hogwarts houses' heirs, and several minor characters for the plot.

The official teaser trailer was released on Facebook and YouTube in June 2017. The Facebook video exceeded 30 million views in less than 48 hours. On 1 December 2017, the final trailer was released on YouTube. The film was not released in cinemas but is available to view for free on YouTube. It was uploaded for viewing on 13 January 2018 and by March 2018 had received over 15 million views. Reception to the film has been generally mixed with criticism levelled at the actors (specifically their ages) and direction, but praise for the special effects and production values.

== Plot ==
As a flashback, Tom Riddle is shown packing his bags and preparing to leave his house. As he does so, he pauses over a photograph of himself and three other students before abandoning it. In the present, Grisha McLaggen is attempting to break into a Soviet Auror warehouse, but despite defeating many of the guards is captured and fed an intravenous drip of Veritaserum while questioned by the KGB General Makarov. In a mixture of flashbacks and present tense a Soviet reconnaissance team finds a chest filled with dark objects, including Riddle's diary, but are killed soon after opening it. In the warehouse, Grisha explains that she was a student with Riddle at Hogwarts, who along with Wiglaf Sigurdsson and Lazarus Smith were the true heirs of the Hogwarts founders (Gryffindor, Slytherin, Ravenclaw, and Hufflepuff, respectively). The heirs formed a club dedicated to "making the world a better place". When an argument occurred between Lazarus and Riddle over Grisha's affections, they fell out. Grisha noted Riddle was becoming distant to them all and changed completely after the incident. Over the last few years Grisha has become an Auror and dedicated herself to tracking down Riddle in the belief she can save him from himself and the dark path.

Under further questioning and flashbacks, it is shown how Riddle stole both Hufflepuff's cup and Slytherin's locket from Hepzibah Smith before killing her and framing her house-elf Hokey, and that Grisha believes he intends to create Horcruxes. She thinks that Riddle's diary – the artefact she was trying to retrieve from the warehouse – will give her a clue as to either his whereabouts, or his intent. She also explains that he has since killed both Lazarus and Wiglaf, and it is implied that he has already started using the name "Voldemort".

After deliberation, Makarov says that he believes her story because she was under the influence of Veritaserum when she told it – yet just because she believes it does not actually mean that it is true; she could be mistaken in her belief. However, he is not willing to take the chance, as the threat of Gellert Grindelwald is still a recent memory and so gives her the diary, saying, "it is a Brit problem", and that they should deal with it. Grisha is released, returned her personal belongings and allowed to leave. As she leaves, Makarov asks her how she knew they had the diary, and Grisha replies, "I didn't – or maybe I did..." before transfiguring into Voldemort and killing Makarov and his assembled guards.

The film ends with a flashback to a second reconnaissance team finding the chest and recovering it. The two Soviets discuss the contents, mentioning that the bones are female (the implication being that they are Grisha's) and what they mean, with one grimly concluding that there must be darkness in order for there to be light.

== Cast ==
- Stefano Rossi as Tom Marvolo Riddle, a dark wizard and Hogwarts student, heir of Salazar Slytherin.
  - Davide Ellena as Lord Voldemort.
- Maddalena Orcali as Grisha McLaggen, Hogwarts student, and Heir of Godric Gryffindor. Orcali also narrates the trailer.
  - Aurora Moroni as young Grisha McLaggen.
- Andrea Deanesi as Wiglaf Sigurdsson, the Heir of Rowena Ravenclaw.
  - Andrea Baglio as young Wiglaf Sigurdsson.
- Andrea Bonfanti as Lazarus Smith, the Heir of Helga Hufflepuff.
- Gelsomina Bassetti as Hepzibah Smith, Lazarus Smith's aunt and noted descendant of Helga Hufflepuff.
- Alessio Dalla Costa as General Makarov, a senior Soviet Auror.

=== Voice actors ===
- Mitchell Thornton as Tom Marvolo Riddle and Lord Voldemort.
- Amy Davies as Grisha McLaggen.
- Rasmus Bækgaard as General Makarov.
- Rorie Stockton as Lazarus Smith and Igor.
- Stefan Chanyaem as Wiglaf Sigurdsson.
- Margaret Ashley as Hepzibah Smith.
- Biscarte Hazencruz as Veteran Soviet Auror.
- Masha Bazhenova as Loudspeaker Voice.

== Development ==
The film was conceived by Pezzato and Prestia as an unofficial prequel to the Harry Potter film series and initially crowdfunded on Kickstarter in 2016. A trailer for the film was officially released in June 2017 through Tryangle Films.

=== Litigation ===
Litigation with Warner Bros. ended the crowdfunding due to copyright violations. The defendants agreed to not generate profit.

== Reception ==
Reception to the film has been generally mixed, with most reviews complimenting the special effects and production values, whilst criticising the acting and direction. Kat Brown of The Telegraph gave the film "Two warm drinks out of five", noting that while "the cast are uniformly gorgeous", they were far too old to portray their ages accurately – "Moroni, supposedly playing an 11-year-old second year, is one lollipop away from being an inappropriate fancy dress costume". Brown was more appreciative of the technical aspects, stating that the magic was impressive, highlighting the use of moving photographs, owls and filming locations. Calla Wahlquist of The Guardian makes similar comments, that "Pezzato does weird things with camera angles", and that "the English dubbing is not great", but counterpoints it with the statement that "the visual effects are, in many places, better than the multimillion-dollar Warner Brothers movies. The costuming and sets are also good" and that she enjoyed the twist ending. Rick Austin writing for Fortress of Solitude is equally dismissive, albeit for different reasons, speaking highly of Pezzato's directing, but criticising "the story, the casting, the acting, the poor dubbing, the scattershot editing and the production design." Common to other reviewers, Austin was critical of the ages of the actors against their supposed characters, but impressed by the special effects.

== Crew ==
- Gianmaria Pezzato – Director, Screenwriter, Editing, VFX
- Stefano Prestia – Producer, Practical FX, Audio Mix/Edit, Foley
- Michele Purin – Director of Photography, Communication Strategist
- Martina Segatta – Production Coordinator, Location Manager
- Sonia Strusi – Make-up Artist, Make-up FX
- Silvia Dalpiaz – Scenographer
- Matthew Steed – Music Composer
- Manuel Venturini – Set Assistant
