= Harry and the Potters =

Harry Potter fandom rock band

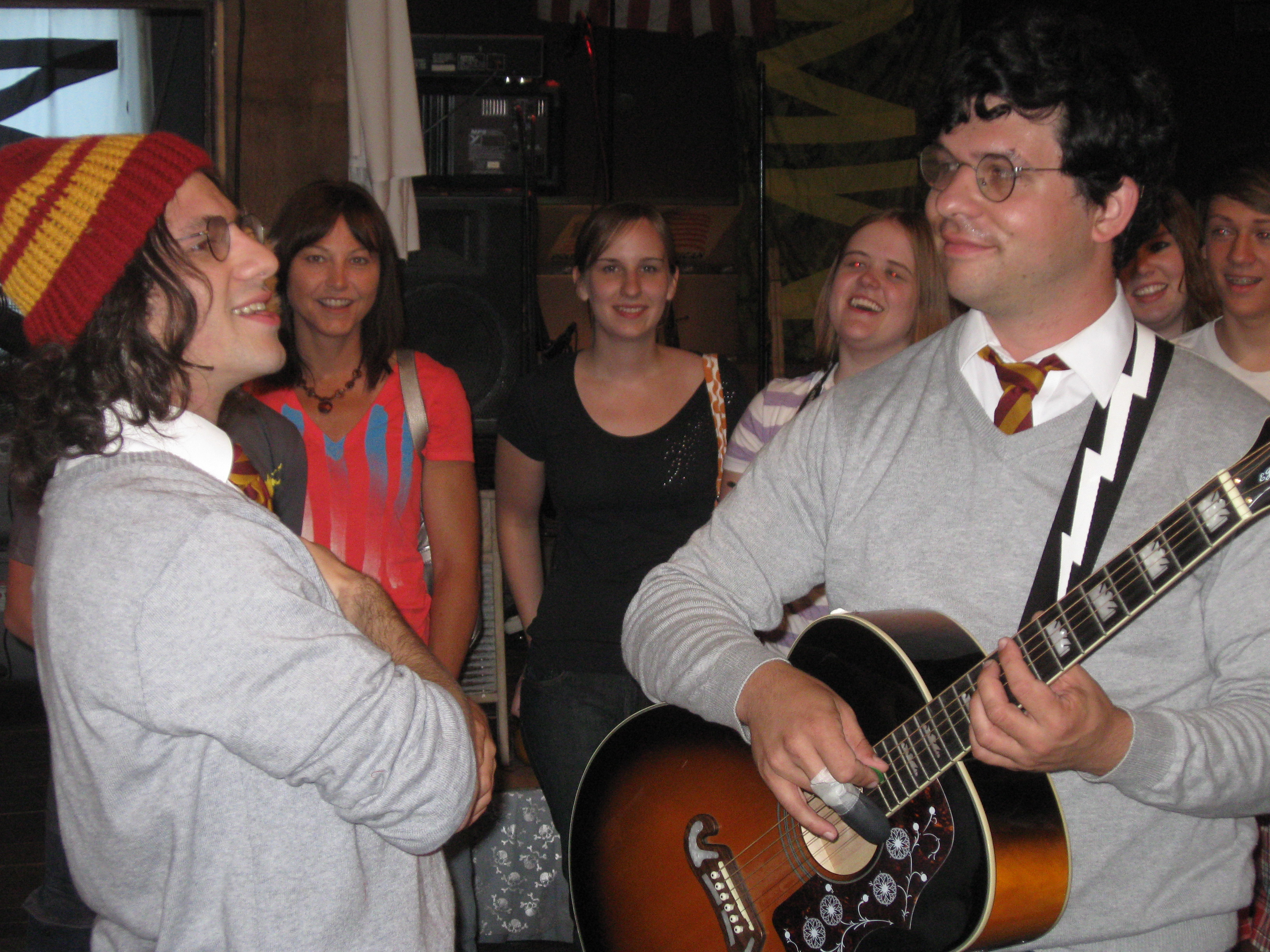
- Harry and the Potters performing in June 2010. From left to right: Joe DeGeorge and Paul DeGeorge

Background information
- Origin: Norwood, Massachusetts
- Genres: Wizard rock, geek rock
- Years active: 2002–present
- Labels: Charming Records; Eskimo Laboratories
- Members: Joe DeGeorge; Paul DeGeorge
- Website: harryandthepotters.com

Harry and the Potters are an American rock band known for spawning the genre of wizard rock. Founded in Norwood, Massachusetts, in 2002, the group is primarily composed of brothers Joe and Paul DeGeorge, both of whom perform under the persona of the title character from the Harry Potter book series. Harry and the Potters are known for their elaborate live performances, and have developed a cult following within the Harry Potter fandom.

The band is often backed up by musicians such as Ernie Kim, Andrew MacLeay, Brad Mehlenbacher, John Clardy, Mike Gintz, Jacob Nathan, Ben Macri, Phillip Dickey, Jason Anderson and Zach Burba. The band's most recent songs feature drummer Mike Harpring and bassist Paul Baribeau.

Since 2002, Harry and the Potters have released three studio albums, five extended plays, and a single. The duo founded the independent record label Eskimo Laboratories, and appeared in the documentary films We Are Wizards and Wizard Rockumentary. They also co-founded charity organization The Harry Potter Alliance, and formed the Wizard Rock EP of the Month Club, an extended play syndicate.

== History ==
=== Formation (2002) ===
In Cambridge, Massachusetts, Paul DeGeorge was developing vaccines for a biotech firm as a chemical engineer. Paul had recently graduated from Tufts University. Outside the lab, Paul was a musician whose indie band—The Secrets—had toured in the northeast from 2001 to 2002. To promote his band, Paul co-founded a small indie label called Eskimo Laboratories. One of the other bands in Eskimo's stable of talent included an act called Ed in the Refridgerators [sic], which was fronted by Paul's 14-year-old brother Joe. Joe DeGeorge was a student at Norwood High School. He and his school friend Andrew MacLeay (A.K.A. Shaggy) had been playing in rock bands together since they were 11 and 12 years old.

A couple of years earlier after reading the Harry Potter books, Paul formulated the premise for Harry and the Potters where the principal Harry Potter characters would be the musicians: Harry as the front man, Ron on guitar, Hermione on bass and Hagrid on drums. During a barbecue at the DeGeorge family's Norwood, Massachusetts home, on June 22, 2002, Joe organized a concert in his backyard featuring Ed and the Refridgerators, the Secrets, and Soltero. However, the latter two bands canceled the day of the event. To rescue a nearly lost opportunity, while waiting for a band to show, the two brothers wrote seven Potter-themed songs. They performed that first concert as Harry and the Potters for six people who remained of their audience. Of those seven backyard songs, five made it onto the band's first album in 2003.

=== Harry and the Potters and Voldemort Can't Stop the Rock! (2003–04) ===
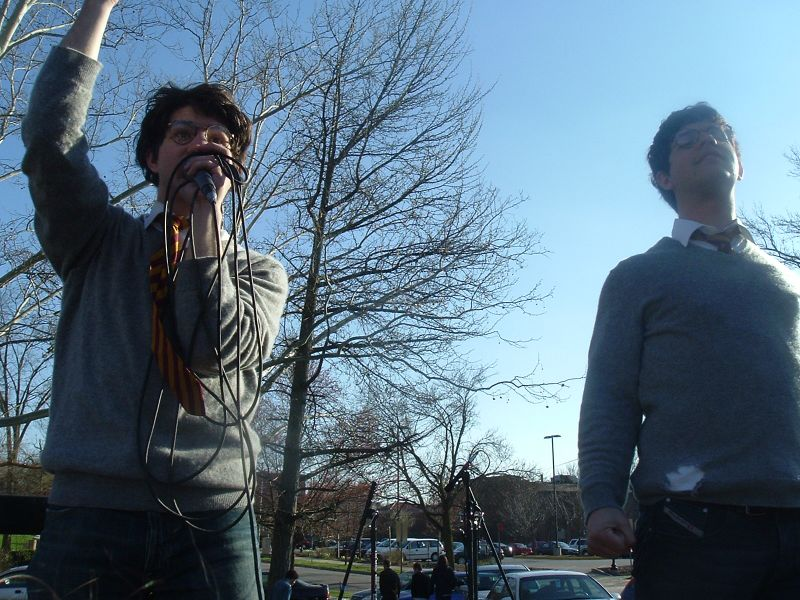
Harry and the Potters performing in Bloomington, Indiana on April 8, 2006

After recruiting drummer Ernie Kim, the band recorded their eponymous debut album over a weekend in the DeGeorge family living room. Released in June 2003 under the Eskimo Laboratories record label, the album contains six of the seven songs composed on June 22, 2002, and another twelve written spontaneously and immediately thereafter recorded. In the summer of 2003, Harry and the Potters set out on an American tour, performing at libraries. The fifth Harry Potter book – Harry Potter and the Order of the Phoenix – came out that summer and on June 21, 2003, the highly anticipated day of release, the band played five sets in a span of 24 hours. The library gigs drew crowds of mostly children and their parents. The brothers played a show at the library in Dorchester, Massachusetts, that August, where they noticed the children in the audience singing along. Joe said, "Paul forgot the words to one of the songs. [The kids] were like, 'You sang it wrong!'" Paul said, "They'd be like, 'Hey, why'd you skip that song?' because they knew the exact sequence of the album." The DeGeorge brothers quickly developed an onstage persona of dressing in the fashion of wizard-school Hogwarts: white shirts under gray crew-neck sweaters, red-and-yellow striped ties, and wire-rim glasses. Both brothers play the role of Harry Potter and dress almost identically; Paul is older and to conform to the character's persona, he is Harry of Year 7; while Joe is the Harry of Year 4.

During May and June 2004, the band worked on their next album, Voldemort Can't Stop the Rock!, in the DeGeorge family shed. Following the release, the band toured heavily. The two brothers drove 13,000 miles across the U.S. and into Canada in their "Potter Mobile", a silver 1998 Ford Windstar minivan with a black lightning bolt emblazoned on its hood. In live concerts, Paul and Joe used pre-recorded backing tracks for much of the tour, but during the second half, Joe called on his childhood friend and former bandmate Andrew MacLeay to join the band temporarily as drummer. During the Voldemort Can't Stop the Rock! tour, Paul and Joe DeGeorge received a letter from Warner Bros. that stated that the brothers were breaking copyright laws. Although Paul sent a letter to Warner Brothers in an attempt to smooth things over, Marc Brandon, the company representative, asked to speak to Paul personally. The two later settled upon a gentlemen's agreement that allowed Harry and the Potters to continue to sell music online and tour, but all other merchandise could only be sold at live shows.

=== Harry and the Potters and the Power of Love (2005–06) ===
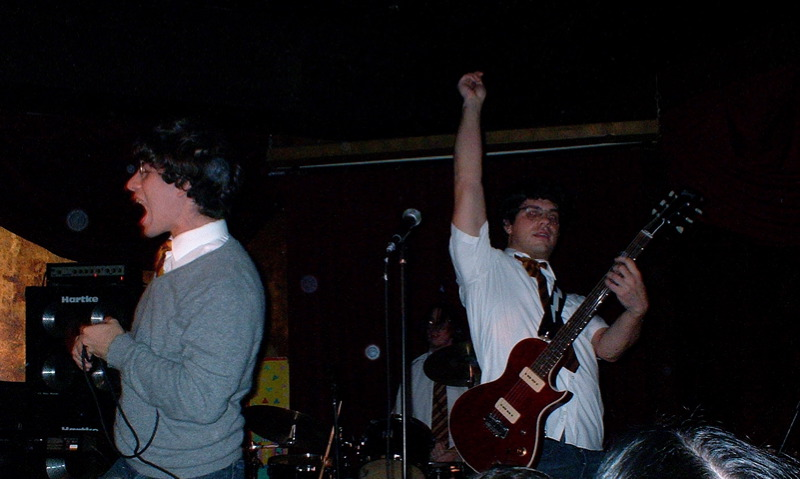
Harry and the Potters on stage in Greenpoint, Brooklyn on September 23, 2006

The following winter, the band began their first overseas tour. In February 2005, they toured the United Kingdom – playing London, Manchester, Milton Keynes, Chester, and Liverpool – and then followed it by playing some gigs in the Netherlands to coincide with the release of the Dutch translation of Harry Potter and the Half-Blood Prince which took place in November 2005. In the Netherlands, they played one of their earliest songs "Platform Nine and 3/4" in Dutch. Pitchfork Media, a web-based music zine, hailed Harry and the Potters as having one of the best five live shows in 2005, quipping that "The Decemberists wish they could lit-rock like this." In the fall of 2005, Joe entered Clark University in Worcester, Massachusetts. While Harry and the Potters play infrequently at rock clubs and other venues—a Yule Ball at the Middle East Downstairs in Cambridge, Massachusetts, in December 2005 attracted an audience of 600 with 200 turned away at the door

The band continued its success and toured early in the year with a new wave 'sock puppet rock band' called Uncle Monsterface who opened for in March 2006. During the summer, they embarked on their third cross-country summer tour ("Summer Reading and Rocking Tour 2006"), this time accompanied by fellow wizard rock band Draco and the Malfoys. Brad Mehlenbacher from Draco and the Malfoys handled drumming duties for the Potters for the entirety of their summer tour. They returned to home recording with the Harry and the Potters and the Power of Love but with a bigger sound and with the assistance of recording veteran Kevin Micka. While in the earlier albums the band's musical style was goofy inept pop-punk, the EP Scarred for Life became musically darker reflecting the penultimate book, Harry Potter and the Half-Blood Prince, as it takes as its central conceit a Harry Potter who has started a hardcore rock band. Paul and Joe departed from their DIY home recording and sought a studio for Scarred for Life (as well as their split EP with the Zambonis), and consequently stated that the songs on the Scarred for Life are among their "most badass".

=== Extended plays and film appearances (2007–09) ===
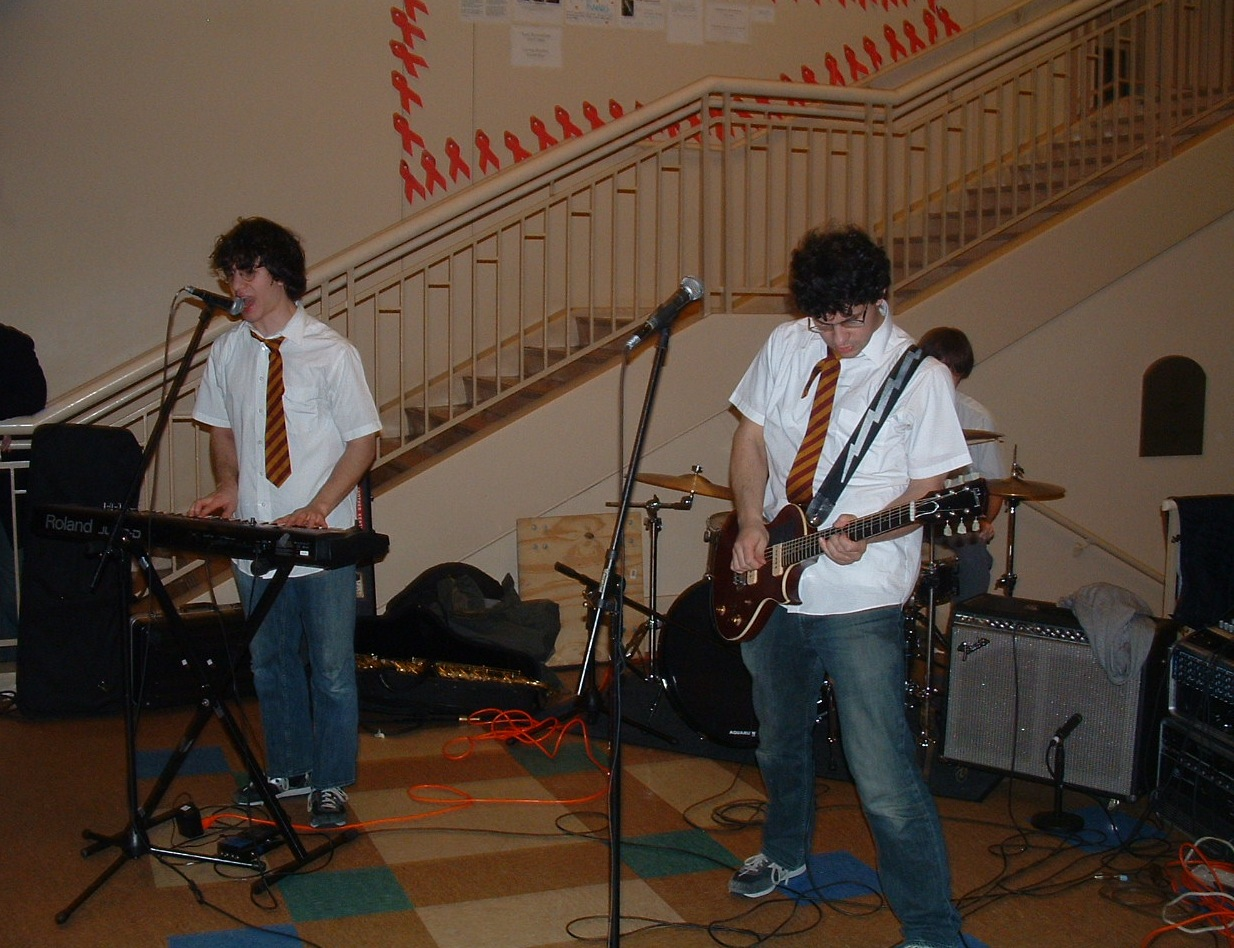
Harry and the Potters performing at Horace Mann School on January 25, 2007

By 2007, Harry and the Potters' fan based indie music genre of wizard rock had grown into an international phenomenon. The band engaged in charity side-projects and activism within the Harry Potter community. In January 2007, Harry and the Potters created the Wizard Rock EP of the Month Club, a mail order subscription club that released an extended play by a different wizard rock band each month. Reflecting wizard rock's literacy focus, the club raises funds for First Book, a non-profit organization that gives children the ability to read and own their first new books. In 2007, the Club raised over $13,000 for the organization. They released their first extended play The Enchanted Ceiling in 2007. May 2007 was also the beginning of their large 70-show summer-library tour across the US and Canada called simply "Summer Tour 2007". Like their initial year in 2003, the summer of 2007 saw the release of another Harry Potter book. Harry and the Potters scheduled the mid-point of the tour to arrive back in their home state and celebrate the July 21 midnight release of the seventh book, Harry Potter and the Deathly Hallows at Harvard Yard. The festivities became a meet-up of a number of wizard rock bands including The Hungarian Horntails and their nemesis Draco and the Malfoys which all played to a large crowd of Harry Potter fans in the Cambridge, Massachusetts college venue. Harry and the Potters resumed their tour which finally wound-up in late August. In Vancouver on July 7, 2007, hundreds of people crowded outside the Vancouver Public Library to see Harry and the Potters. ABC News reported that the band usually charge $5 to $10 for tickets to their shows, though some performances are free. Harry and the Potters said 600 people turned out for a July 10, 2007 show in Portland, Oregon.

In summer 2008, Harry and the Potters undertook a summer tour, Unlimited Enthusiasm, with Math the Band, Uncle Monsterface and Jason Anderson. One of the stops in that tour was Nerdapalooza. That fall they released a short punk rock EP, In the Cupboard as part of the Wizard Rock EP of the Month Club. Two full-length feature film projects documenting Harry and the Potters and the wizard rock movement, We Are Wizards and The Wizard Rockumentary, were released in 2008.

The band played its 500th show in June 2009 at Norwood Elementary School (MA) the founding members' hometown. The group continued the Wizard Rock EP of the Month Club in 2009, and as a member of the club, they released their third extended play The Yule Ball EP, which featured a CD and a DVD of their performance at the Fourth Annual Yule Ball.

=== Further career and Lumos (2010–present) ===
In April 2010, the group announced a series of shows in the Midwestern United States, Scandinavia, and Ireland for July and August.

In Summer 2011, Harry and the Potters embarked on another summer tour entitled, Ride The Lightning. The tour was to the biggest since 2007, playing dates all throughout the United States. The first show was held May 25 in Portland, ME and the last show was July 31 at the Knitting Factory in New York. Drummer Jacob Nathan played with the group throughout the tour. Jacob is a member of the band 926 Main Street Apt. 2, which he formed with Joe DeGeorge and Emily Barnett while attending college at Clark University.

In 2015, Harry and the Potters released the EP Hedwig Lives for digital download, which included the tracks "The Great Motorcycle Explosion of '97" and "Ridin' in the Night".

At a live show on March 30, 2018, the band debuted songs from their forthcoming fourth studio album that will be about The Deathly Hallows. They later announced that the album would also feature the anti-folk musician Kimya Dawson as a guest vocalist. Parts of this album were recorded in a studio, and others were recorded at the Lawrence, Kansas public library. On April 23, 2019, the band unveiled a Kickstarter to help recoup the cost of recording the album, which they revealed was named Lumos. Backers could also choose rewards that include an additional album entitled Mostly Camping, as well as a vinyl single called the "Harry Potter Boogie."

== Lyrical themes and style ==
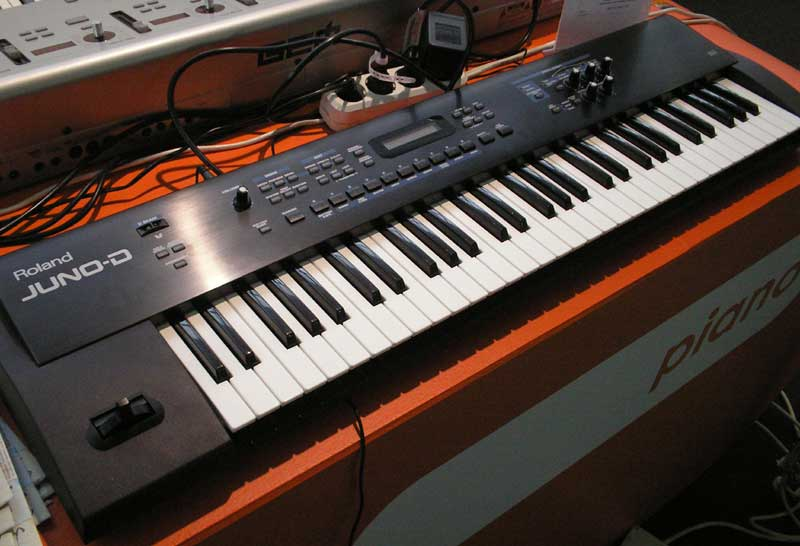
Harry and the Potters often use Roland Juno-D synthesizers (as pictured) in their music.

Harry and the Potters couple their rough-edged music with themed lyrics, which define the band as much as the costumes. The straight-forward presentation of adolescent concerns and direness in the simplest of worries is enjoyed by fans. They poke fun at awkward situations from the books. For example, in the song "The Human Hosepipe", they sing, "Maybe you shouldn't have brought up Cedric Diggory/Because I'd rather not talk about your dead ex-boyfriends over coffee." Two other examples of the bands take on teenage angst are seen in the song "Save Ginny Weasley" where they sing, "Are you petrified of being petrified?" and the song "The Godfather." where the gothic or mock-morbid line "Why do I always think that I am going to die?" is sung to an up-beat tune.

For the Harry Potter fandom, Harry and the Potters refer to words and phrases in the books, including Hogwarts, Harry's Firebolt, Felix Felicis, the Flying Car, wizard chess, platform nine and three-quarters, The Burrow, the three-headed dog Fluffy, Mrs. Norris, the basilisk, The Marauder's Map, various spells and incantations, and the Invisibility Cloak.

Harry and the Potters is both performance art project and a rock band. Musically, they are similar to other indie rock music with the exception that the Harry Potter books inspire the lyrics. As Joe said in a 2005 interview, "We try to take the themes from the books and amplify them." Their musical sound is described as "simple, catchy rock – think The White Stripes crossed with Raffi – where everyone sings along which is easy because in songs like 'Voldemort Can't Stop the Rock' the title is pretty much the only line." Another reviewer cites "a touch of the Ramones in their ultra simple lyrics."

The band is organized with Paul and Joe playing their songs in a simple basic guitar-synth-and-drums indie pop style and they sing in the semi-deadpan way; a review found the vocal delivery similar to that of They Might Be Giants. The raison d’être of the band is to put enough energy and spirit into their songs to make them fun.

The band is not musically polished. Paul has joked that, if they had known of the band's popularity, they might have made "an effort to sing in tune. But it's hard to anticipate that sort of thing when you're just writing silly songs and recording them in your living room over a weekend.". Despite this, Paul says that the fans "know we're not the best singers and keyboard players, but we're okay. And they think, well, I could do that, too. I think that's really encouraging to people ..." Paul describes the brothers as a "bridge between this mainstream phenomena of Harry Potter and the indie rock underground. Plus, we're also pretty strong adherents to the DIY ideal." The two brothers promote making music independently and DIY indie rock and punk music.

The Washington Post describes the brothers as having vast quantities of both passion and ability to engage an audience: the "combination of their happy, who-cares personalities and Harry Potter fanaticism has cast a spell over book-loving teens across the country." Paul said, "the band is neither geeky nor cool but 'geeky-cool'. I think the indie-rock community at the very least realizes we're taking a very DIY approach to this."

== Campaigning and activism ==
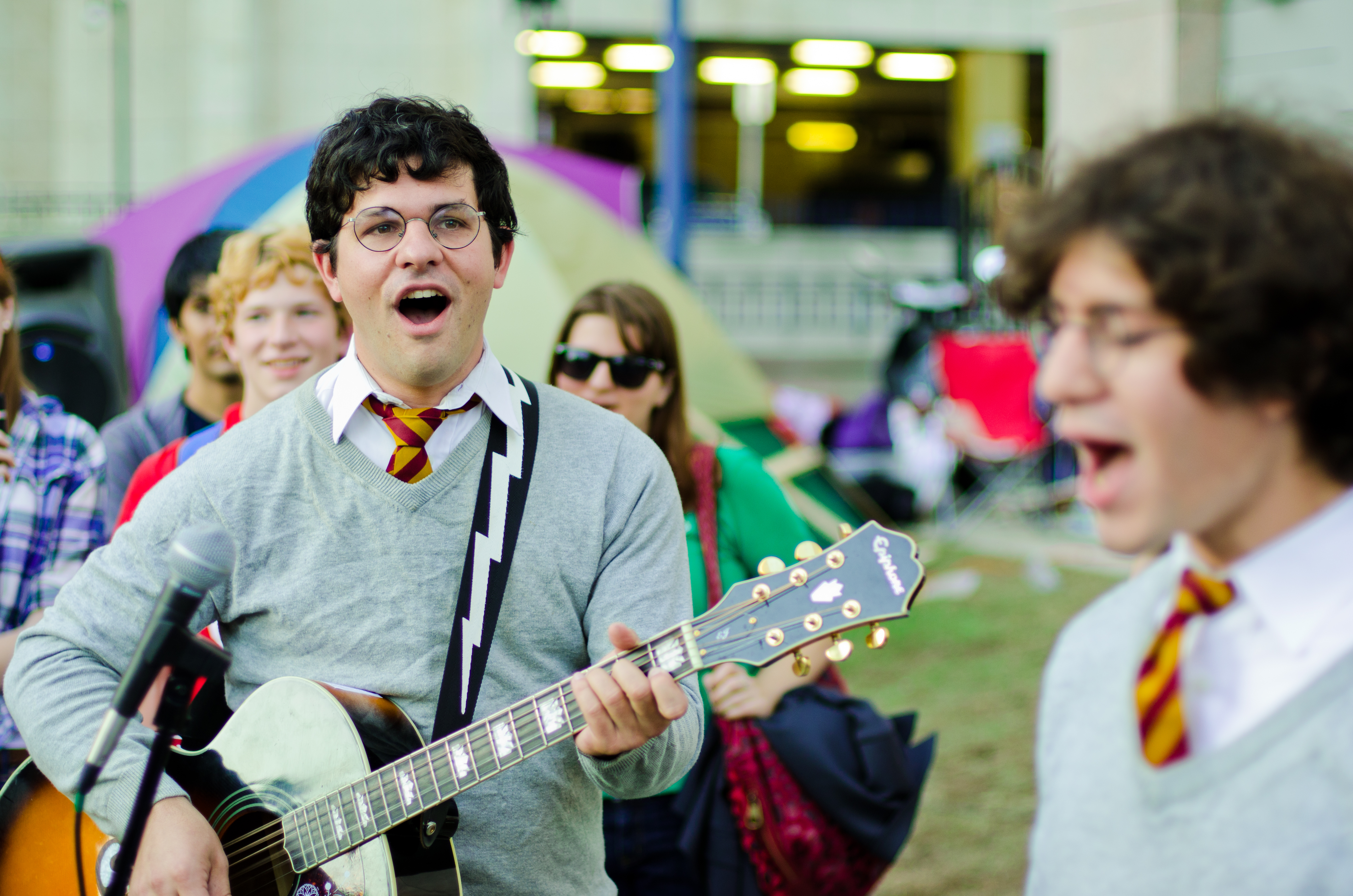
Harry and the Potters performing at the Occupy Boston protests against social and economic inequality on 7 October 2011.

In 2005 the duo co-founded the non-profit organization The Harry Potter Alliance with Andrew Slack, Seth Reibstein and Sarah Newberry, an organization that uses the Harry Potter books as a platform for inspiring real-world activism, which amongst other activities, helps "wake the world up" to the genocide in Darfur. The projects invites its members to inform their local senator to support the Darfur Accountability and Divestment Act. The Harry Potter Alliance raises awareness for these projects by holding wizard rock concerts and by selling memorabilia to help fund these campaigns.

Harry and the Potters have also collaborated the Harry Potter Alliance compilation album Rocking Out Against Voldemedia, with a song entitled "Don't Believe It". The purpose of the album was to achieve the right to free press and against media consolidation by asking site viewers to contact their member of Congress to support S 2332, the "Media Ownership Act of 2007." Paul said their third EP, the 2007 The Enchanted Ceiling was recorded in their living room.

Harry and the Potters actively promote literacy. Their literary activism includes the reference to Tipper Gore and the Parents Music Resource Center in the song "Voldemort Can't Stop the Rock", which contains the verse, "And we won't let the Dark Lord ruin our party/ Just like Tipper Gore tried with the PMRC."

== Legacy and influence ==
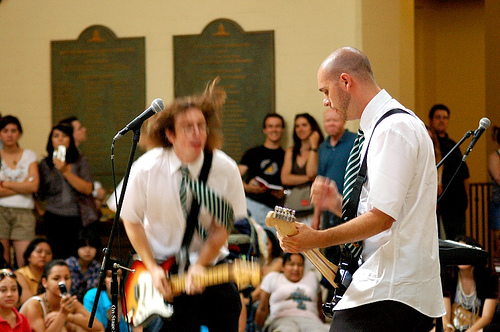
Wizard rock band Draco and the Malfoys perform under the persona of Draco Malfoy.

Harry and the Potters have influenced similar acts, such as Draco and the Malfoys, The Whomping Willows, and The Remus Lupins. Wizard rock bands generally play all-ages shows at libraries, bookstores and schools, as the promotion of reading is a hallmark of the genre. In turn, because of their active promotion of literacy, young-adult and teen librarians have been promoting the band. While Harry and the Potters would become notable for making libraries their primary venue, Joe DeGeorge did not see a future in the modest venues: "I think we thought we'd play a few libraries." Paul added, "We thought it would be short-lived. We weren't like super fans, so we didn't understand this whole (Harry Potter) subculture when we started." As The Washington Post wrote, "wizard rock is an escape into a different world – a world of non-judgmental fun where grown-ups dress as wizards, evil is vanquished by song, and reading is cool." The peculiar success of Harry and the Potters has led Paul to "sense a growing affection for us amongst other musicians" and at home. The Boston Phoenix has called Harry and the Potters the "Pink Floyd of Potterdom."

In 2005 there was a wave of new wizard rock bands. The brothers' do-it-yourself musical ethos caught on with bands. Like Harry and the Potters, these new bands also take on the persona, or dress as Harry Potter-themed characters. Though most fans of the music are previous fans of Harry Potter, some bands have attracted listeners outside of the Harry Potter fanbase. Paul and Joe are aware of around 200 other Harry Potter-related rock bands who at least record and post songs on the Internet. The Boston Phoenix wondered—in spite of fully booked calendars—how long wizard rock would last once there are no new stories to riff on, as their musical identity is contingent on the lasting success and popularity of a book series. "In some ways", said Paul, "we want to tie things off and consider it a done deal. We've always viewed this as a project that had a finite life and end point."

== Discography ==
- Harry and the Potters (2003)
- Voldemort Can't Stop the Rock! (2004)
- Harry and the Potters and the Power of Love (2006)
- Lumos (2019)
