= Draco and the Malfoys =

American musical duo

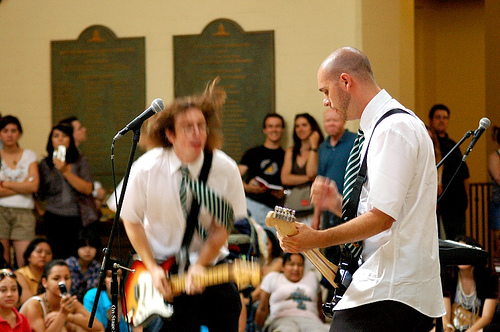
- From left to right: Bradley Mehlenbacher and Brian Ross during a performance at Los Angeles Public Library in Los Angeles, California, in July, 2006

Background information
- Origin: Woonsocket, Rhode Island
- Genre: Wizard rock
- Years active: 2004–2011; 2013–present
- Members: Brian Ross; Bradley Mehlenbacher
- Website: http://evilwizardrock.com/

Draco and the Malfoys are a wizard rock band founded in Woonsocket, Rhode Island in 2004. The group is composed of half-brothers Brian Ross and Bradley Mehlenbacher, who both perform under the persona of Draco Malfoy from the Harry Potter book series.

Since the band's formation, they have released five full-length studio albums, one extended play release, and have contributed to four compilation albums.

In an interview with Wizrocklopedia in late 2013, Brian Ross confirmed that he and Bradley were in the process of making a new album and released a new single called "Cheat to Win."

== History ==
=== Early career (2004–2005) ===
Ross and Mehlenbacher originally conceived Draco and the Malfoys as a parody of Harry and the Potters, who were performing at a local house party. In late 2004, Matt Maggiacomo invited the Harry and the Potters to play at an all-Harry Potter show at his Rhode Island home. That night, Maggiacomo made his debut as the Whomping Willows, and his friends Mehlenbacher and Ross played for the first time as Draco and the Malfoys.

Ross and Mehlenbacher both perform as Draco Malfoy, a character from the Harry Potter book series. "We look like nothing like Draco Malfoy, and are clearly too old to be going to Hogwarts," said Brian in a 2007 interview. At the time, Ross was 32 and Mehlenbacher was nearly 27. "So we say that we're Draco from years 19 and 15 at Hogwarts."

=== Harry Potter fandom and the future of wizard rock (2006–2007) ===
Ross said in the ABC News story that the mock rivalry between Draco and the Malfoys and Harry and the Potters is all for show. The bands toured together for a month in the summer of 2007 and have collaborated on albums."

It's a catchy concept, two bands portraying the most beloved and hated characters in the Harry Potter series, both celebrating their passion for the fictional wizard world with catchy tunes and kid-friendly rock concerts."

The Boston Phoenix interviewed Draco and the Malfoys about wizard rock:

And neither the Harrys nor the Dracos think of the burgeoning community as a joke, or even as some bastard-dork cousin of indie-rock. Both groups - Draco and the Malfoys and Harry and the Potters - take their efforts quite seriously, especially at this juncture. Amidst the fervor leading up to the release of Harry Potter and the Deathly Hallows, wizard rockers seem to be drawing bigger and better crowds, at every show.

For Draco and the Malfoys, the band is an escape from the humdrum pressures of hipster irony — like the Potters, they’re prone to rocking out in libraries. In this venture, says Ross, he and his band are just a pipeline for Pottermania. “With this, we’re all fans of something much larger,” he says. “Everyone shows up to have a good time, never to be a snob about the music, ever, ever, ever.”

In the same interview, the Boston Phoenix asked Draco and the Malfoys about the future of wizard rock given the completion of the Harry Potter book series in July 2007.

Ross sound[ed] almost tearful, in fact, when he professes his faith that the Potter phenomenon will outlast Deathly Hallows. He and his brother have both been in bands where, “if you go four hours away from your hometown, nobody comes to see you.” When the wiz kid is involved, they have a built-in fan base wherever they go. “Our experience with wizard rock has been the best musical experience of our lives,” says Ross. “We don’t really have any interest in stopping at all.”

=== Recent events and breakup (2008–2011) ===
Draco and the Malfoys, Tom Riddle and Friends, Whomping Willows and the Moaning Myrtles played at Wrockstock 2008 at a YMCA summer camp lodge in the Ozark foothills. They released their third studio album, It's A Slytherin World and a compilation album, Anthology of Slytherin Folk Music, in 2009. They have released plans to create a series of extended plays, the first being Draco and the Malfoys Celebrate... Piracy!. In December 2011, Draco and the Malfoys played their last show at the Yule Ball. On December 19, 2011, they posted this message on their Facebook page: "Thank you for making our final two shows this weekend completely amazing. It's been an unbelievably gratifying 6+ years. We've been playing music together our whole lives, and always dreamt of touring and playing together. Thank you all for making our dreams come true. You've given us more awesome times than we ever could have imagined. Here's to all of our futures. Cheers! ♥ Brian & Bradley."

== Musical style ==
=== Lyrics ===
Ross and Mehlenbacher write lyrics from Draco's perspective. Thus dressed in Slytherin-themed costumes (green and silver ties), their anti-Potter lyrics – "You may have freed our house elf, and brought doubt to our family name/ but your parents still got toasted by a big, green, glowing flame" – were initially a parody of wizard rock but were met with success and another Harry Potter-themed garage band was born. Draco and the Malfoys write catchy pop songs from the perspective of Harry's rival and tormentor, Draco Malfoy – "My dad's always there to open all my doors / You have to call a Patronus just to catch a glimpse of yours... my dad is rich, and your dad is dead" – goes one chorus. They make reference to various Harry Potter objects, such as the Mirror of Erised and the Patronus Charm. The lyrics are generally mocking and condescending towards Harry, Ron, and others. BostonNOW asked the band if Ross ever had "any anti-fans at your shows?"; Ross replied, "Never. Everyone is very supportive, although we will get little kids getting mad and yelling at us because we write songs making fun of Neville and Harry". The Advocate of Stamford, Connecticut reported that:

The pair said they had fun trying to figure out why Draco's so mean, Mehlenbacher said. Their lyrics are written tongue-in-cheek, and all but the very youngest Harry Potter fans seem to understand that.
"Little kids really take it personally," Ross, 32, told the Advocate. "They yell at us."

=== Influences ===
The band was conceived as a parody of the band band Harry and the Potters, who were in turn inspired by the J. K. Rowling book series Harry Potter.

ABC News reported that Brian Ross and Bradley Mehlenbacher's "love for the Harry Potter book series is no less than that of the DeGeorge brothers, but Brian and Bradley seem to better recognize the absurdity of the bands, even mocking the idea that Paul and Joe represent two differently aged versions of the popular wizard."

=== Instrumental ===
Draco and the Malfoys both play guitar. Ross plays a Fender Stratocaster, and Mehlenbacher plays a Fender Telecaster. They are often backed up by a BOSS Dr. Rhythm drum machine (both live and in studio recordings).

== Discography ==
Studio albums

- Draco and the Malfoys (2005)
- Party Like You're Evil! (2007)
- It's a Slytherin World (2009)
- An Anthology of Slytherin Folk Songs (2009)
- Cheat to Win (2014)

Extended plays

- Family (2007)

== See also ==
- Filk
