= Voldemort Can't Stop the Rock! =

Studio album by Harry and the Potters
- Released: July 1, 2004
- Recorded: May – June 2004 at the DeGeorge family shed, Norwood, Massachusetts
- Genre: Wizard rock, indie rock, post-hardcore
- Length: 41:58
- Label: Eskimo Laboratories
- Producer: Harry and the Potters

Harry and the Potters chronology
Harry and the Potters (2003)	Voldemort Can't Stop the Rock! (2004)	Harry and the Potters and the Power of Love (2006)

Voldemort Can't Stop the Rock! is the second studio album by indie rock band Harry and the Potters, released on July 1, 2004. The album was primarily inspired by the fifth novel in the Harry Potter book series. Although some of the songs revisit events from previous books in the series, a majority of the songs on the album relate to the rebellion of Harry and Dumbledore's Army against the Ministry of Magic, Dolores Umbridge, Lord Voldemort, and the Death Eaters.

The album's title song references Tipper Gore and the Parents Music Resource Center's attempts in the 1980s to censor music. The song contains the verse, "And we won't let the Dark Lord ruin our party / Just like Tipper Gore tried with the PMRC."

== Context ==
During a barbecue at Paul and Joe DeGeorge family's Norwood Massachusetts home on 22 June 2002, Joe had advertised a concert with Ed and the Refrigerators and several other indie bands. The venue was the back yard shed. Perhaps the venue was too modest but while an audience had arrived, the bands did not. To rescue a nearly lost opportunity, while waiting hopefully for a band to show, Harry and the Potters came into existence over the next hour when the two brothers wrote seven Potter-themed songs. The following year, the band released an album, Harry and the Potters, to critical acclaim. After the release of the fifth Harry Potter book, the brothers started to record Voldemort Can't Stop the Rock!, a new album based on The Order of the Phoenix.

== Writing and recording ==
Harry and the Potters actively promote literacy, and as the band began writing more music, their lyrics slowly began turning more political. For instance, the album's title song references Tipper Gore and the Parents Music Resource Center (PMRC)'s attempts in the 1980s to censor music. The song contains the verse, "And we won't let the Dark Lord ruin our party / Just like Tipper Gore tried with the PMRC."

Voldemort Can't Stop the Rock! was recorded in May and June 2004 in the DeGeorge family shed. The bands friend and fellow musician Ernie Kim played drums again.

== Promotion and reception ==
Professional ratings
Review scores
Source	Rating
Sputnikmusic	(3.8/5)

Following the release of Voldemort Can't Stop the Rock, the band began touring once again. At first, the band toured lightly, but during the summer of 2004, Paul got a two-month leave from work. The band played more than thirty shows, although they largely skipped the Midwest.

The two brothers drove 13,000 miles across the U.S. and into Canada in their "Potter Mobile", a silver 1998 Ford Windstar minivan with a black lightning bolt emblazoned on its hood. In live concerts, Paul and Joe used pre-recorded backing tracks for much of the tour, but during the second half, Joe called on his childhood friend and former bandmate Andrew MacLeay to join the band temporarily as drummer.

During the late winter of 2005, the band undertook their first overseas tour. In February 2005, they toured the United Kingdom – playing London, Manchester, Milton Keynes, Chester, and Liverpool – and then followed it by playing some gigs in the Netherlands to coincide with the release of the Dutch translation of Harry Potter and the Half-Blood Prince which took place in November 2005. In the Netherlands, they played one of their earliest songs "Platform Nine and 3/4" in Dutch.

Following the release of Voldemort Can't Stop the Rock!, Harry and the Potters enjoyed success from respectable quarters. The reputable Pitchfork Media hailed Harry and the Potters as having one of the best five live shows in 2005. The 'zine quipped "Unless you frequent MuggleNet.com, you probably aren't aware that the greatest rock and roll tour of the year took place this past summer in public libraries across America" and "The Decemberists wish they could lit-rock like this." In a 2010 article, it was revealed by TuneCore that Harry and the Potters had shifted 200,000 digital downloads of an unspecified song. Paul DeGeorge later attributed this remarkable feat to the fact that the song "Human Hosepipe" was released on a free compilation album, which in turn was downloaded more than 200,000 times.

During the band's tour of England, Paul and Joe DeGeorge received a letter from Warner Brothers that stated that the brothers were breaking copyright laws. Although Paul sent a letter to Warner Brothers in an attempt to smooth things over, Marc Brandon, the company representative, asked to speak to Paul personally. The two later settled upon a gentleman's agreement that, in essence, would allow Harry and the Potters to continue to sell music online and tour, but all other merchandise could only be sold at live shows.

== Track listing ==
All tracks are written by Paul DeGeorge, Joe DeGeorge and Ernie Kim.

No.	Title	Length
1.	"Voldemort Can't Stop the Rock!"	3:05
2.	"The Weasle"	2:01
3.	"The Missing Arm of Viktor Krum"	1:54
4.	"Fred and George"	2:26
5.	"Keeping Secrets from Me"	1:44
6.	"Cornelius Fudge is an Ass"	1:34
7.	"Dumbledore's Army"	4:56
8.	"These Dreams Are Dark"	3:16
9.	"Stick it to Dolores"	2:32
10.	"S.P.E.W."	1:01
11.	"The Human Hosepipe"	3:33
12.	"Luna Lovegood is OK"	2:20
13.	"The Godfather: Part II"	2:25
14.	"The Weapon"	4:27
Total length:		41:58

== Personnel ==
Harry and the Potters

- Paul DeGeorge – vocals, guitar, baritone saxophone, melodica
- Joe DeGeorge – vocals, keyboard, tenor saxophone, glockenspiel, theremin

Additional personnel

- Ernie Kim – drums
- Georg Pedersen – artwork design
