= Harry Potter and the Methods of Rationality =

Fan fiction by Eliezer Yudkowsky

- Author: Eliezer Yudkowsky
- Language: English
- Genre: Harry Potter fan fiction, hard fantasy
- Publication date: 28 February 2010 – 14 March 2015
- Publication place: United States
- Media type: Digital serial
- Website: hpmor.com

Harry Potter and the Methods of Rationality (HPMOR) is a work of Harry Potter fan fiction by Eliezer Yudkowsky published on FanFiction.Net as a serial from 28 February 2010, to 14 March 2015, totaling 122 chapters and over 660,000 words. It adapts the story of Harry Potter to explain complex concepts in cognitive science, philosophy, and the scientific method. Yudkowsky's reimagining supposes that Harry's aunt Petunia Evans married an Oxford professor and homeschooled Harry in science and rational thinking, allowing Harry to enter the magical world with ideals from the Age of Enlightenment and an experimental spirit. The fan fiction spans one year, covering Harry's first year at Hogwarts. HPMOR has inspired other works of fan fiction, art, and poetry, is connected to the contemporary rationalist community, and is popular among rationalists and effective altruists.

== Plot ==
In this fan fiction's alternate Harry Potter series universe, Lily Potter magically made her sister, Petunia Evans, more beautiful, allowing her to marry Oxford professor Michael Verres. When their nephew Harry James Potter is orphaned, they adopt him as Harry James Potter-Evans-Verres and homeschool him in science and rationality. When Harry turns 11, Petunia and Professor McGonagall reveal the wizarding world and Harry's defeat of Lord Voldemort to him and Michael. Harry becomes irritated over the wizarding society's inconsistencies and backwardness. When traveling to Hogwarts, Harry becomes distanced from Ron Weasley and befriends Draco Malfoy and Hermione Granger.

At Hogwarts, the Sorting Hat sends Harry and Hermione to Ravenclaw and Draco to Slytherin. As school begins, Harry comes into conflict with the faculty, befriends Professor Quirrell over their shared dispositions, and analyzes magic through the scientific method with Draco and Hermione. His efforts get Draco to question his discriminatory ideology towards Muggle-borns and allow Harry to invent partial Transfiguration, which transmutes parts of wholes by applying timeless physics. Quirrell starts a school program involving student armies, embroiling Harry, Hermione, and Draco in further conflict.

After winter break, Quirrell procures a Dementor to teach students the Patronus charm. Though Hermione and Harry initially fail, Harry recognizes Dementors as shadows of death and invents the True Patronus charm, destroying the Dementor. After Harry teaches him to cast a regular Patronus, Draco discovers Harry can speak Parseltongue and alleges to him that Dumbledore murdered his mother. Quirrell reveals himself as a snake Animagus to Harry and convinces him to help spirit a supposedly manipulated Bellatrix Black from Azkaban, leaving her in hiding and causing Headmaster Dumbledore to believe that Voldemort had returned.

Later, after several bullying incidents, Hermione establishes the student organization S.P.H.E.W. to protest misogyny in heroism and fight bullies, causing widespread chaos. She is accused of attempting to murder Draco; Harry pays Lucius Malfoy, Draco's father, to prevent her from being sentenced to Azkaban, and Lucius withdraws Draco from Hogwarts. Harry and Dumbledore's Order of the Phoenix theorize that Quirrell is David Monroe, a long-missing opponent of Voldemort. Later, a mountain troll enters Hogwarts and kills Hermione before Harry manages to slay it. Grieving, Harry vows to resurrect Hermione and negotiates with Lucius, absolving the Malfoys of guilt in her murder in exchange for Lucius returning his money, cancelling his debt, acknowledging her innocence, and returning Draco to Hogwarts.

Near year's end, Harry discovers Quirrell drinking unicorn blood, supposedly to delay death from a health condition. A month later, Quirrell tricks and captures Harry, revealing himself as Voldemort's spirit possessing Quirrell and how he framed and murdered Hermione. He coerces Harry into helping him steal the Philosopher's Stone, which can make temporary transmutations permanent, from a magical mirror in Hogwarts, by promising to resurrect Hermione in exchange. After they succeed, Dumbledore appears and tries to seal Voldemort outside time; Voldemort endangers Harry, forcing Dumbledore to seal himself instead.

Voldemort's spirit abandons Quirrell and uses the Stone to incarnate himself; he and Harry resurrect Hermione, whose body Harry had stolen and preserved, using the Stone and Harry's True Patronus. Voldemort gives Hermione the magic of a mountain troll and unicorn through sacrificial rituals, rendering her near-immortal. He then murders Quirrell as a human sacrifice to give her a Horcrux. Knowing that prophecy foretells that Harry endangers the world, Voldemort summons Lucius and his other Death Eaters, forces Harry to swear an Unbreakable Vow never to risk destroying the world, and orders his murder. Harry quickly improvises an attack using partial Transfiguration that kills every Death Eater and incapacitates Voldemort, whom he memory-wipes and transfigures into his ring's jewel. He claims the Stone and stages a scene to make people believe that "David Monroe" died defeating Voldemort and resurrected Hermione.

After the battle, McGonagall gives Dumbledore's letters to Harry, who learns from them that prophecies had convinced Dumbledore to gamble the future of the world's peoples on him and bequeath his positions and assets to him. Harry helps a grieving Draco find his mother, Narcissa, and plans to close Azkaban, expecting Hermione to destroy its Dementors using the True Patronus. He plans to use the Philosopher's Stone to restore people's health and youth.

== History ==
Yudkowsky wrote Harry Potter and the Methods of Rationality as a medium to promote the rationalist community and skills he advocates on his community blog, LessWrong. According to him, "I'd been reading a lot of Harry Potter fan fiction at the time the plot of HPMOR spontaneously burped itself into existence inside my mind, so it came out as a Harry Potter story, [...] If I had to rationalize it afterward, I'd say the Potterverse is a very rich environment for a curious thinker, and there's a large number of potential readers who would enter at least moderately familiar with the Harry Potter universe."

Yudkowsky has used HPMOR to solicit donations for the Center for Applied Rationality, which teaches courses based on his work.

Yudkowsky refused a suggestion from David Whelan to sell HPMOR as an original story after rewriting it to remove the Harry Potter setting's elements from it to avoid copyright infringement, as E. L. James did with Fifty Shades, which was originally a Twilight fan fiction, saying, "That's not possible in this case. HPMOR is fundamentally linked to, and can only be understood against the background of, the original Harry Potter novels. Numerous scenes are meant to be understood in the light of other scenes in the original HP."

Ahead of HPMOR's conclusion in March 2015, Whelan reported plans for worldwide wrap parties.

== Reception ==
=== Critical response ===
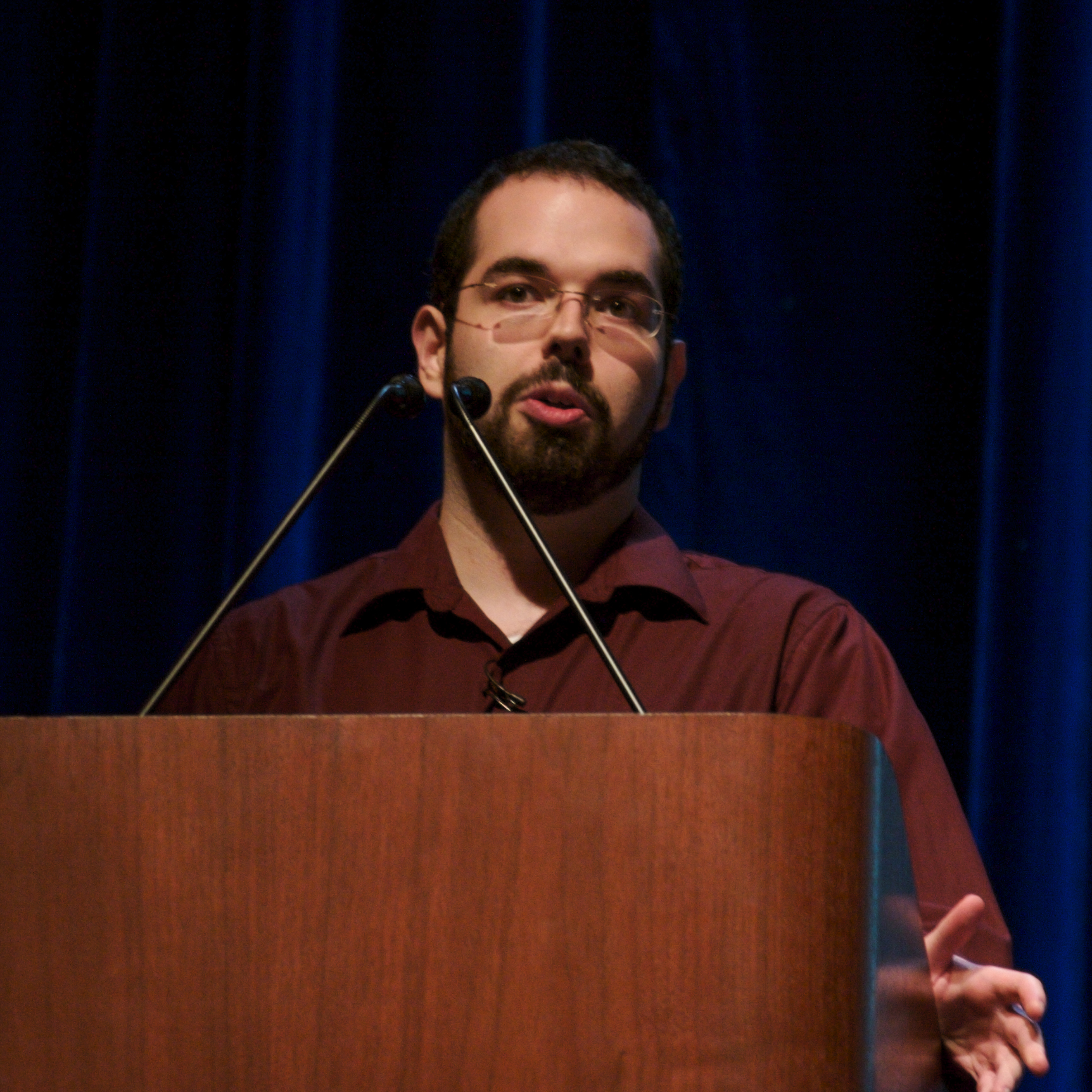
Yudkowsky giving a talk at Stanford University

Harry Potter and the Methods of Rationality is popular on FanFiction.Net, though it has also caused polarization among readers. In 2011, Daniel D. Snyder of The Atlantic recorded how HPMOR "caused uproar in the fan fiction community, drawing both condemnations and praise" on online message boards "for its blasphemous—or brilliant—treatment of the canon." In 2015, David Whelan of Vice described HPMOR as "the most popular Harry Potter book you've never heard of" and called it "brilliantly written, challenging, and—curiously—mind altering." He also questioned whether the story was an academic exercise or a vehicle for promoting a belief system, comparing it to Edwin Abbott's mathematical novella Flatland.

Hugo Award-winning science fiction author David Brin praised HPMOR in remarks quoted by The Atlantic in 2011, saying, "It's a terrific series, subtle and dramatic and stimulating." In a 2014 interview with The Guardian, American politician Ben Wikler discussed the podcast adaptation and described HPMOR as "the #1 fan fiction series of all time" and compared Harry to his friend Aaron Swartz's skeptical attitude. Writing for The Washington Post, legal scholar William Baude praised HPMOR as "the best Harry Potter book ever written, though it is not written by J.K. Rowling" in 2014 and "one of my favorite books written this millennium" in 2015. In 2015, Vakasha Sachdev of Hindustan Times described HPMOR as "a thinking person's story about magic and heroism" and discussed how "the conflict between good and evil is represented as a battle between knowledge and ignorance," eliciting his praise. In 2017, Carol Pinchefsky of Syfy lauded HPMOR as "a platform on which the writer bounces off complex ideas in a way that's accessible and downright fun." In a 2019 interview for The Sydney Morning Herald, young adult writer Lili Wilkinson said that she adores HPMOR. Rhys McKay hailed HPMOR in a 2019 article for Who as "one of the best fanfics ever written" and "a familiar yet all-new take on the Wizarding world."

In 2023, Amanda Silberling of TechCrunch found the story entertaining but "really tedious", describing Harry as a "know-it-all".

In his 2012 book Singularity Rising, James D. Miller, an economics professor at Smith College and one of Yudkowsky's acquaintances, praised HPMOR as an "excellent marketing strategy" for Yudkowsky's views about a "pseudoscientific-sounding" apocalypse, arguing that its carefully crafted lessons about rationality could overcome readers' skepticism. While he criticized Yudkowsky's strategy as "profoundly arrogant" for assuming that making people more rational would make them more agreeable to his ideas, he nonetheless agreed that Yudkowsky was correct and disclosed that he had contributed to Yudkowsky's Singularity Institute.

In a 2023 essay for The New Atlantis, Tara Isabella Burton interpreted Harry's ambition to understand magic and become a god as an expression of the rationalist aspiration to transcend human limitations and reshape the world.

=== Accolades ===
The fan audiobook for HPMOR was a finalist in the Parsec Awards in 2012 and 2015.

== Translations ==
=== Russian ===
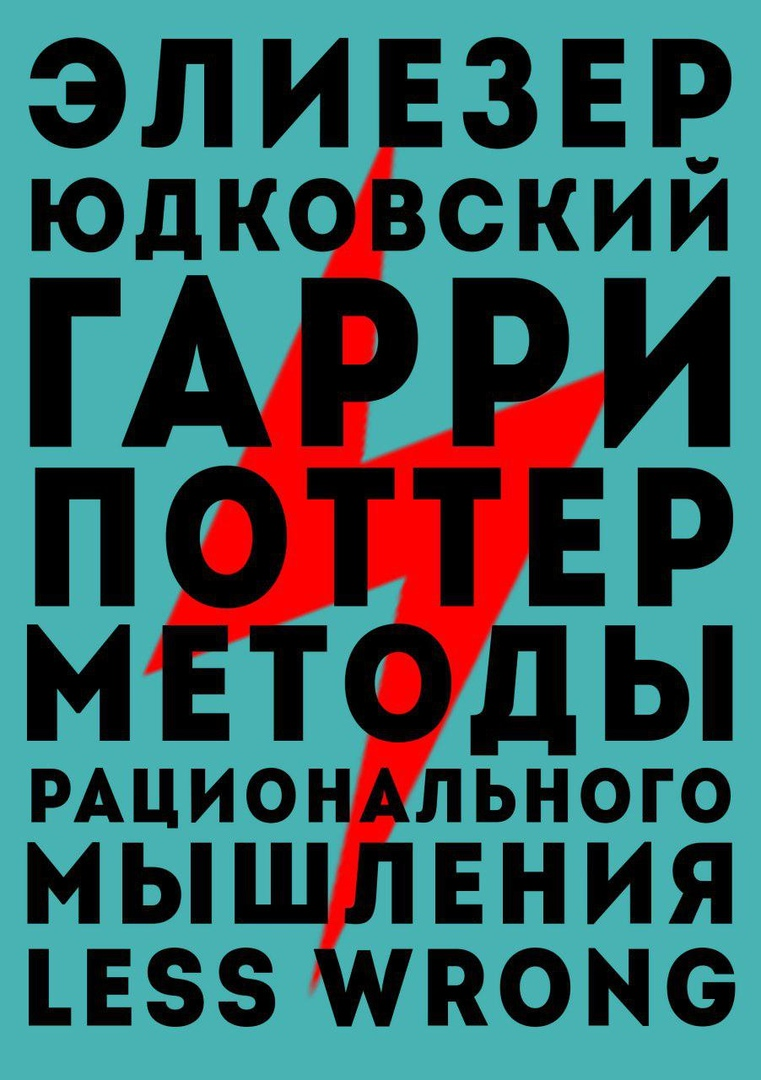
A rejected cover variant of the Russian print project available as a dust jacket

On 17 July 2018, Mikhail Samin, a former head of the Russian Pastafarian Church who had previously published The Gospel of the Flying Spaghetti Monster in Russian, launched a non-commercial crowdfunding campaign hosted on Planeta.ru alongside about 200 helpers to print a three-volume edition of the Russian translation of Harry Potter and the Methods of Rationality. Lin Lobaryov, the former lead editor of Mir Fantastiki, compiled the books. Samin's campaign reached its 1.086 million ₽ (approximately US$17,000) goal within 30 hours; it ended on 30 September with 11.4 million ₽ collected (approximately US$175,000), having involved 7,278 people, and became the biggest Russian crowdfunding project for a day before a fundraiser hosted on CrowdRepublic for the Russian translation for Gloomhaven surpassed it.

Though Samin originally planned to print 1,000 copies of HPMOR, his campaign's success led him to print twenty-one times more copies than that. Yudkowsky supported Samin's efforts and wrote an exclusive introduction for HPMOR's Russian printing, though the campaign's popularity surprised him. In October 2018, Novaya Gazeta described Samin's HPMOR publication project as the largest of its kind, surpassing many previous low-circulation fan printings, and he sent some Russian copies of HPMOR to libraries and others to schools as prizes for Olympiad winners. J.K. Rowling and her agents refused Russian publishing house Eksmo's request for commercial publication of HPMOR.

=== Other ===
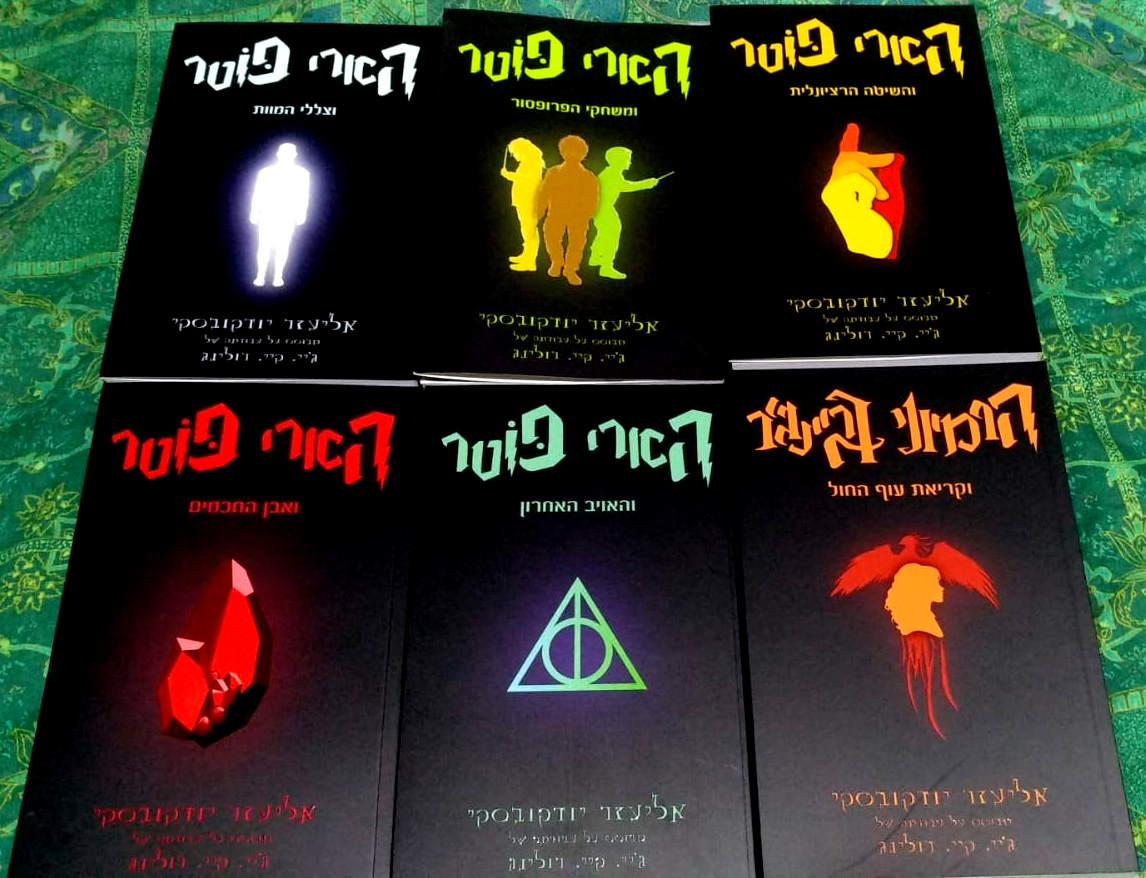
Covers of the Hebrew printed edition

HPMOR has Chinese, Czech, French, German, Hebrew, Indonesian, Italian, Japanese, Latvian, Norwegian, Spanish, Swedish, and Ukrainian translations.

== See also ==
- All the Young Dudes
- Harry Potter in Calcutta
- Hogwarts School of Prayer and Miracles
- My Immortal
