= Harry Potter in Calcutta =

2003 book by Uttam Ghosh

- Author: Uttam Ghosh
- Language: Bengali
- Series: Harry Potter (unofficial)
- Genre: Children's fantasy; Fan fiction
- Set in: Calcutta, India
- Publisher: Nandita Publishers
- Publication place: India

Harry Potter in Calcutta, also called Harry Potter Kolkataye, is a 2003 Indian Bengali language children's fantasy novel written by Uttam Ghosh and published by Nandita Publishers. It is a work of unapproved fan fiction that features the character Harry Potter in a new setting: Calcutta, India. The book was removed from publication due to legal action taken by J. K. Rowling, the creator of the Harry Potter franchise.

== Premise ==
The novel takes place after the events of Harry Potter and the Goblet of Fire. The story begins with Harry Potter traveling to Calcutta on his Nimbus 2000 broomstick at the invitation of a local boy named Junto. Upon arrival, Harry and Junto embark on various adventures throughout the city, encountering numerous characters from Bengali literature.

== Legal issues ==
The publication of Harry Potter in Calcutta faced legal challenges. J. K. Rowling's lawyers demanded the withdrawal of the book from the market, citing unauthorized use of the Harry Potter name and characters. The book, along with an unauthorized Bengali translation of Harry Potter and the Philosopher's Stone, was pulled from sale in India. The book sold several thousand copies before it ceased publication, including 5,000 at the Kolkata Book Fair.

== See also ==
- Legal disputes over the Harry Potter series
- All the Young Dudes
- Harry Potter and the Methods of Rationality
- Hogwarts School of Prayer and Miracles
- My Immortal
- Tanya Grotter
