= All the Young Dudes (fan fiction) =

Fan fiction set in the Harry Potter universe

- Fan-made artwork for the story reimagining the album cover of All the Young Dudes (1972) with the Marauders
- Author: MsKingBean89
- Language: English
- Series: Harry Potter (canon-divergent fan fiction)
- Genres: Harry Potter fan fiction, romance, coming of age, LGBTQ+ fiction
- Set in: 1971–1995
- Publication date: March 2017–November 2018
- Media type: Fan fiction

All the Young Dudes is a fan fiction written by Archive of Our Own (AO3) user MsKingBean89 set in the Harry Potter universe. It was published from March 2017 to November 2018, is over 500,000 words long and contains 188 chapters. The story takes its title from the song "All the Young Dudes", performed by the English rock band Mott the Hoople, and interweaves music from the 1970s in its chapters.

The story starts in the early 1970s and follows Remus Lupin's years at Hogwarts and the love story between himself and Sirius Black. It ends in summer 1995, around the beginning of the events of Harry Potter and the Order of the Phoenix. The story has garnered positive response from critics and fans while also gaining popularity online for its internet memes, fancastings and LGBTQ+ representation.

== Plot summary ==
Remus Lupin, the son of wizard Lyall Lupin and Muggle Hope Jenkins, was bitten by Fenrir Greyback, a werewolf, and became one himself. After Lyall died by suicide, Hope placed Lupin in St. Edmund's, a children's home for boys. Lupin is looked after by Matron who locks him up during the full moon to keep him from hurting any of the other boys, while simultaneously preserving his secret. In 1971, Lupin is visited by Albus Dumbledore who gives Lupin his acceptance letter to Hogwarts School of Witchcraft and Wizardry. On full moons, he would be taken through to a shack where he can undergo his transformation in privacy and safety.

During his first year at Hogwarts, Lupin befriends James Potter, Sirius Black and Peter Pettigrew. Though Lupin is hesitant and cold towards them at first, the four become close friends and begin to call themselves the Marauders. Lupin also befriends Lily Evans, Marlene McKinnon and Mary MacDonald, who go on to form a close bond with the Marauders. Lupin develops a particularly close connection with Black, bonding with him over their shared scars. Black is also the first to learn Lupin is a werewolf. During the summer of 1975, Lupin discovers that he is gay after having intimate relations with Grant Chapman, his new roommate at St. Edmunds. Upon returning to Hogwarts for the school year, Lupin finds he has a crush on Black. On Lupin's birthday, he kisses Black, and in the midst of their sixth year, the two become an unofficial couple. In the summer between their sixth and seventh year, whilst on a camping trip, Lupin comes out to the rest of his friends. Lupin and Black decide to become an official couple, though they decide to keep their relationship private. Lupin later reunites with his mother Hope in his seventh year, who eventually dies from lung cancer.

After their schooling, Lupin and Black move into an apartment in London and join the Order of the Phoenix and help in the war effort against the rising Dark Lord, Voldemort. Lupin is tasked by the Order to infiltrate a pack of werewolves led by Greyback, and subsequently becomes an advocate for them while liberating a few. On his return, Lupin attends Potter and Evans' wedding, however, a prophecy regarding their newborn son compels them to go into hiding. Lupin's constant werewolf advocacy leads Black to suspect that he may be a traitor, causing turmoil between them. While Lupin leaves to enlist the help of the liberated werewolves, Pettigrew betrays Potter and Evans to Voldemort, who are consequently killed. Black is subsequently framed for revealing their whereabouts, as well as supposedly murdering Pettigrew among others, and is sent to Azkaban. (Note: While the entire Wizarding World is led to believe Peter is deceased, it is later revealed in Harry Potter and the Prisoner of Azkaban, which takes place concurrently to the final chapters of the novel, that he survived and lived as a rat.) McKinnon is also killed while MacDonald leaves to marry a Muggle in Jamaica.

After seemingly losing all of his friends and Black's apparent betrayal, Lupin shuts himself off from the Wizarding World and finds comfort in his old childhood friend, Grant. The two become a couple and live in Lupin and Black's apartment. Lupin also reveals his magical side to Grant. In 1993, Lupin is asked by Dumbledore to return to Hogwarts as the Defense Against the Dark Arts professor after Black escapes Azkaban, and during the year, Black's innocence is revealed. (Note: As depicted in Harry Potter and the Prisoner of Azkaban.) Upon Black's return, Grant moves to Brighton for a new job after realizing that Lupin loves Black more. Lupin and Black reconcile. (Note: As depicted in Harry Potter and the Order of the Phoenix.) Several years later following Lupin and Black's deaths during the Second Wizarding War, an older Grant meets Lupin's son, Teddy, and reminisces on his relationship with Lupin. (Note: This scene is in an epilogue titled Out of the Blue, released separately on AO3, and set after the events of Harry Potter and the Deathly Hallows.)

== Background and publication ==
"Wolfstar" is the paired-ship name between the Harry Potter characters Remus Lupin and Sirius Black. In 2011, David Thewlis, the actor who played Lupin in the films, stated that he was told by Harry Potter and the Prisoner of Azkaban director Alfonso Cuarón "that [Lupin] was, in fact, gay, so [he had] been playing the part like a gay man for quite a long time". He added that after Lupin married Nymphadora Tonks, he "just saw it as a phase [Lupin must have] went through". Vanity Fair writer Joanna Robinson noted that aside from the 'phase' comment, "it's easy to see how Lupin—a man who is haunted and ashamed of a deeply personal secret, in this case, being a werewolf—could translate to many readers as homosexual".

All the Young Dudes was published on Archive of Our Own (AO3) between March 2017 and November 2018. The story begins in the early 1970s and follows Lupin's childhood and becoming a werewolf, his years at Hogwarts, his fight in the First Wizarding War, his werewolf advocacy and his relationship with Sirius Black. The story ends at the beginning of the events of Harry Potter and the Order of the Phoenix where it is stated that he and Black are living together. It has over 500,000 words and consists of 188 chapters. Other related works were released on AO3 by the author including short stories, unreleased chapters and an epilogue titled Out of the Blue.

== Reception ==
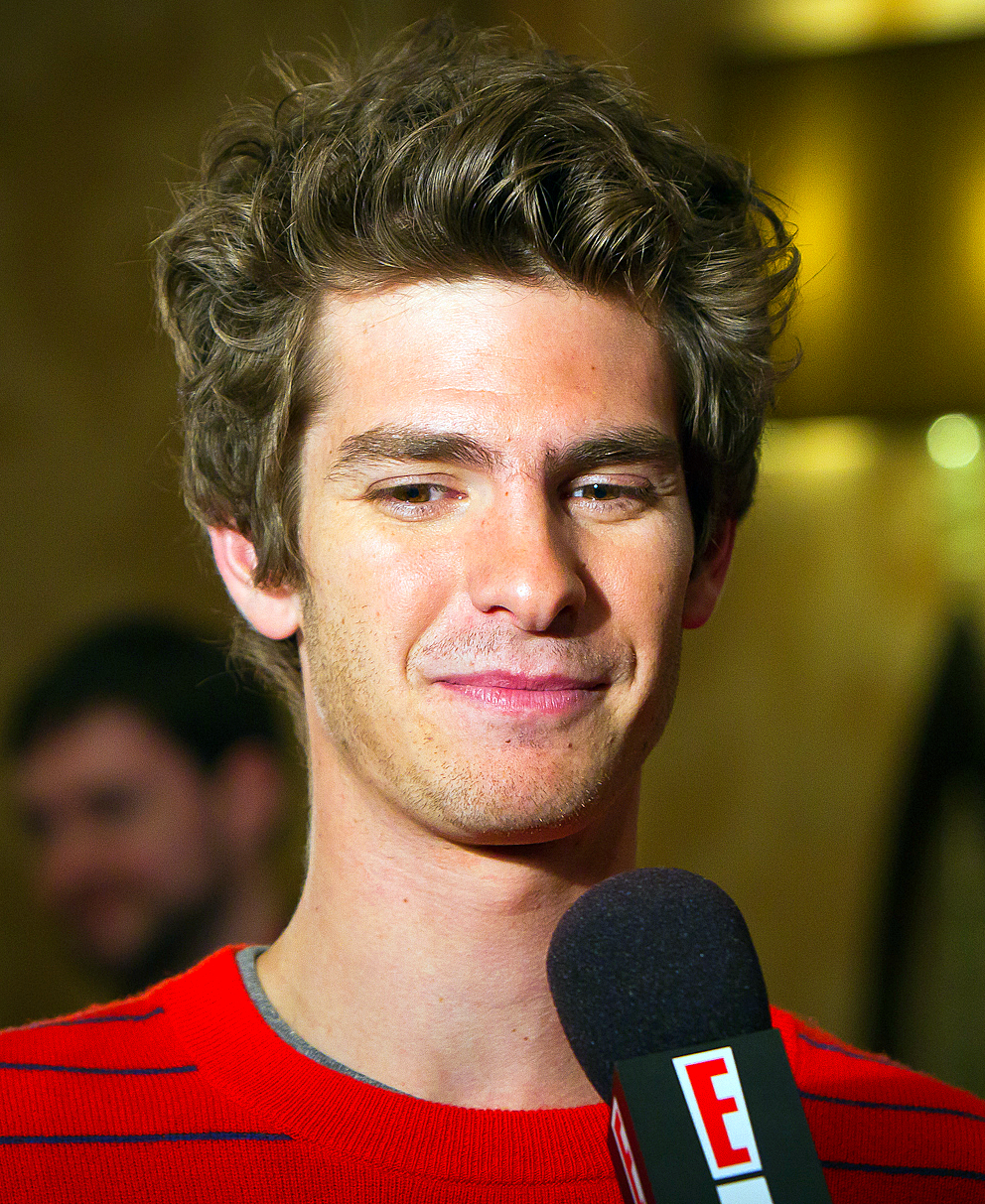
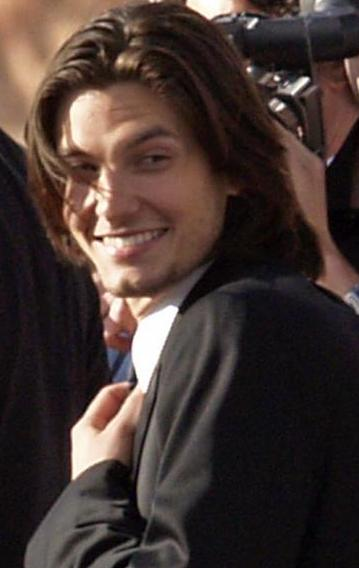
Actors Andrew Garfield (left) and Ben Barnes (right) have been the most popular fancasting for the characters Remus Lupin and Sirius Black respectively.

=== Media response ===
Upon release, All the Young Dudes has gained a positive reception. The Mary Sue writer Benedetta Geddo noted that the story is "a beautifully written story of friends and war and happiness and loss". She highlighted the story's love story between Lupin and Black, noting that "the queer subtext has always been there" in the original Harry Potter novels, adding that their love story was written "realistically and beautiful, immersing it in its historical and cultural context and delivering on the high stakes the characters are living through". Slate posited that the reason the story is so "engrossing" is the extent to which it is "detailed and invested it is in building a world outside of the one Rowling created".

Screen Rant writer Meagan Bojarski listed the story on the sites Most Popular Fanfiction For Each Major Ship list, adding that "because of its length and depth, many fans consider it a proper book unto itself and accept its information as canon in the greater Harry Potter world". Another Screen Rant writer, Liz Hersey, wrote that because of Rowling's controversial comments, Harry Potter fan-fiction such as All the Young Dudes becomes "valuable, as it's an artistic space that fans can inhabit without having to grapple with Rowling's involvement" adding that the story "perfectly represents what makes the Harry Potter series so beloved".

=== Impact and representation ===
All the Young Dudes is the most viewed piece of fan fiction on AO3, with over 21,000,000 hits. In addition, the story is the top Harry Potter fan-fiction on the site and has become an influence for other "Wolfstar" stories. It also gained popularity on TikTok and the Harry Potter fandom at the end of 2020 and the beginning of 2021. On TikTok, the All the Young Dudes' hashtag, #ATYD, has over 1.5 billion views. TikTokers often fancast the characters (choosing celebrities and actors which they believe look like the characters) alongside creating memes about the story. Popular fancasts include Andrew Garfield as Remus Lupin, Ben Barnes as Sirius Black, Dane DeHaan as Peter Pettigrew and Aaron Taylor-Johnson as James Potter. Barnes and Garfield have acknowledged the fancast, with Garfield calling it flattering and a "sweet thought". There have also been memes on social media about MsKingBean89's identity being Taylor Swift, with comparisons of the story made to her 2020 single "Cardigan".

Liz Hersey noted the story's impact on the LGBTQ+ community, noting that fan-fictions such as All the Young Dudes "allow fans to play matchmaker" but also allows its queer "readers and writers to feel represented as many popular movie franchises don't have characters from that community". Her Campus writer Vitoria Prates also praised the story for its queer representation.

== Novelisation as Wolfboy ==
On March 12, 2026, an Instagram account for BookBrunch reported on a "seven figure auction for former fanfic at London Book Fair". In April, Publishers Weekly and The Bookseller confirmed that a novelized adaptation of All the Young Dudes, titled Wolfboy, will be the first of a trilogy set at the "mysterious Hatherlea Experimental School" where "two 17-year-old best friends—a werewolf and a telepath-in-training—are struggling with the trials and tribulations of adolescence, and the fact they might just be falling in love". The rights to the adaptation were acquired from literary agent Veronique Baxter by publisher Rebecca Hilsdon, on behalf of Penguin Books' publishing house Penguin Michael Joseph following a six-way action. The Bookseller writer Lauren Brown also reported that the novel would be published in Autumn 2027 under the pseudonym BN King, a variation of MsKingBean89's username in order to protect her anonymous identity.

== See also ==
- Harry Potter and the Methods of Rationality
- Harry Potter in Calcutta
- Hogwarts School of Prayer and Miracles
- My Immortal
