= Legal disputes over the Harry Potter series =

Since first coming to wide notice in the late 1990s, the Harry Potter book series by J. K. Rowling has been the subject of a number of legal disputes. Rowling, her various publishers and Time Warner, the owner of the rights to the Harry Potter films, have taken numerous legal actions to protect their copyrights, and also have fielded accusations of copyright theft themselves. The worldwide popularity of the Harry Potter series has led to the appearance of a number of locally-produced, unauthorised sequels and other derivative works, leading to efforts to ban or contain them. While these legal proceedings have countered a number of cases of outright piracy, other attempts have targeted not-for-profit endeavours and have been criticised.

Another area of legal dispute involves a series of injunctions obtained by Rowling and her publishers to prohibit anyone from distributing or reading her books before their official release dates. The sweeping powers of these injunctions have sometimes drawn criticism from civil liberties and free speech campaigners and led to debates over the "right to read". One of these injunctions was used in an unrelated trespassing case as precedent supporting the issuing of an injunction against a John Doe.

Outside these controversies, a number of particular incidents related to Harry Potter have also led, or almost led, to legal action. In 2005, a man was sentenced to four years in prison after firing a replica gun at a journalist during a staged deal for stolen copies of an unreleased Harry Potter novel, and attempting to blackmail the publisher with threats of releasing secrets from the book. Then in 2007 Bloomsbury Publishing contemplated legal action against the supermarket chain Asda for libel after the company accused them of overpricing the final Harry Potter novel, Harry Potter and the Deathly Hallows.

== Allegations of copyright and trademark infringement against Rowling ==
=== Nancy Stouffer ===
In 1999, American author Nancy Kathleen Stouffer alleged copyright and trademark infringement by Rowling of her 1984 works The Legend of Rah and the Muggles (ISBN 1-58989-400-6) and Larry Potter and His Best Friend Lilly. The primary basis for Stouffer's case rested in her own purported invention of the word "Muggles", the name of a race of mutant humanoids in The Legend of Rah and the Muggles, and Larry Potter, the title character of a series of activity booklets for children. Larry Potter, like Harry Potter, is a bespectacled boy with dark hair, though he is not a character in The Legend of Rah and the Muggles. Stouffer also drew a number of other comparisons, such as a castle on a lake, a receiving room and wooden doors. Portions of Rah were originally published in booklet form in 1986 by Ande Publishing Company, a company founded by Stouffer together with a group of friends and family. Ande Publishing filed for bankruptcy in September 1987 without selling any of its booklets in the United States or elsewhere. Rowling has stated that she first visited the United States in 1998.

Rowling, along with Scholastic Press (her American publisher) and Warner Bros. (holders of the series' film rights), pre-empted Stouffer in 2002 with a suit of their own seeking a declaratory judgment that they had not infringed on any of Stouffer's works. The court found in Rowling's favour, granting summary judgment and holding that "no reasonable juror could find a likelihood of confusion as to the source of the two parties' works". During the course of the trial, it was held that Rowling proved "by clear and convincing evidence, that Stouffer has perpetrated a fraud on the Court through her submission of fraudulent documents as well as through her untruthful testimony", including changing pages years after the fact to retroactively insert the word "muggle". Her case was dismissed with prejudice and she was fined $50,000 for her "pattern of intentional bad faith conduct" in relation to her employment of fraudulent submissions, as well as being ordered to pay a portion of the plaintiffs' legal fees. Stouffer appealed the decision in 2004, but in 2005 the Second Circuit Court of Appeals affirmed the ruling. In 2006 she stated on her website that she was planning to republish her books and was entertaining the possibility of another lawsuit against Warner Bros., J. K. Rowling and Scholastic Press.

The Legend of Rah and the Muggles is out of print. In early 2001, it was published by Thurman House, LLC, a Maryland publishing company. Thurman House, formed by Ottenheimer Publishers to republish the works of Nancy Stouffer, was closed when Ottenheimer ceased operations in 2002 after filing for bankruptcy. Stouffer later asserted that any copies of the book published by Thurman House are unauthorized because the publisher failed to honour its contractual obligations to her.

=== The Wyrd Sisters ===
In 2005, Warner Bros. offered CAD$5,000 (later CAD$50,000) to the Canadian folk band the Wyrd Sisters for the rights to use their name in the film version of Harry Potter and the Goblet of Fire. Rowling had written a scene in the novel in which a band called the Weird Sisters appeared at a school dance, and the group owned the rights to the name in Canada. However, the offer was declined, and instead the band undertook a legal action against Warner Bros., as well as Jarvis Cocker of Pulp and Jonny Greenwood and Phil Selway of Radiohead, who were to play the band in the film. All plans to use the name in the movie were later abandoned. Despite that decision, the Canadian band filed a CAD$40-million ($39 million) lawsuit against Warner in Ontario court. In connection with the lawsuit, the band brought an interlocutory injunction hoping to prevent the release of the film. The injunction application was dismissed. The entire suit was dismissed in November 2005. In June 2006, an Ontario judge decreed that the band pay Warner Bros. CAD$140,000 in legal costs, describing their lawsuit as "highly intrusive". The group stated that they planned to appeal the decision. Jarvis Cocker initially wished to release an album of "Weird Sisters"-themed music with collaborators including Franz Ferdinand, Jack White and Iggy Pop, but the project was dropped as a result of the lawsuit. The Wyrd Sisters reported death threats from irate Harry Potter fans. As of March 2010, the lawsuit has been settled out of court, the details sealed.

=== Adrian Jacobs ===
In June 2009, the estate of Adrian Jacobs, a children's author who died in 1997, sued Rowling's publishers, Bloomsbury, for £500 million, accusing her of having plagiarised "substantial parts" of his work in writing the novel Harry Potter and the Goblet of Fire. In a statement, Jacobs's family claimed that a scene in Goblet of Fire was substantially similar to Jacobs's book The Adventures of Willy the Wizard: Livid Land.

Both Willy and Harry are required to work out the exact nature of the main task of the contest which they both achieve in a bathroom assisted by clues from helpers, in order to discover how to rescue human hostages imprisoned by a community of half-human, half-animal fantasy creatures.

They also launched a joint suit against Rowling and her publishers. Bloomsbury countered with a statement of its own, saying that "This claim is without merit and will be defended vigorously," and that Rowling "had never heard of Adrian Jacobs nor seen, read or heard of his book Willy the Wizard until this claim was first made in 2004, almost seven years after the publication of the first Harry Potter book." The Jacobs estate, driven by his son and grandson, have published a website with details and excerpts from the book, according to the Toronto Star. In July 2010, the estate filed suit against Rowling's American publisher, Scholastic, demanding that the company burn all copies of Goblet of Fire.

On 6 January 2011, the US lawsuit against Scholastic was dismissed. The judge in the case stated that there was not enough similarity between the two books to make a case for plagiarism. In the UK courts, on 21 March 2011, Paul Allen, a trustee of the Jacobs estate, was ordered to pay as security to the court 65% of the costs faced by Bloomsbury and Rowling, amounting to over £1.5million, to avoid the claim being struck out. It was reported in The Bookseller that Paul Allen has appealed against paying this sum. As a condition of the appeal, he paid £50,000 to the court in May 2011. The claim was formally struck out in July 2011 after the deadline for Allen's initial payment was missed.

== International publications ==
In 2002, an unauthorised Chinese-language sequel titled Harry Potter and Bao Zoulong (Chinese: Simplified: 哈利波特与豹走龙, Traditional: 哈利波特與豹走龍, Hanyu Pinyin: Hālì Bōtè yǔ Bào Zǒulóng) appeared for sale in the People's Republic of China. (In English-language media this was mistranslated as Harry Potter and Leopard-Walk-Up-to-Dragon.) According to translated excerpts, the book principally consists of the text of J. R. R. Tolkien's The Hobbit, but with most names changed to those of Harry Potter characters. The book was quickly recognised by media outlets as a fake. Rowling and Warner Bros. took steps to stop its distribution. Copies were briefly distributed around the world, including e-book copies traded on the Internet. In November 2002, the Bashu Publishing House, in the southwestern city of Chengdu, agreed to pay a £1,600 fine and publish an apology in China's Legal Times for printing and distributing the novel. As of 2007, the identity of the anonymous author had not been discovered. The opening of Harry Potter and Bao Zoulong, translated into English, was included in several news articles. As of 2007, it is estimated that there are fifteen million copies of fraudulent Harry Potter novels circulating in China, among them titles such as Harry Potter and the Porcelain Doll (otherwise known as Harry Potter and Ciwawa), Harry Potter and the Filler of Big, Harry Potter and the Half-Blood Relative Prince, and Harry Potter and the Golden Armor. In 2007, Rowling's agents, the Christopher Little Literary Agency, began to discuss the possibility of legal proceedings concerning a fake version of Harry Potter and the Deathly Hallows that appeared in China ten days before the actual book's publication.

In 2003, legal pressure from Harry Potter's publishers led an Indian publisher to stop publication of Harry Potter in Calcutta by Uttam Ghosh; a work in which Harry meets figures from Bengali literature. The case was settled out of court.

Also in 2003, courts in the Netherlands prevented the distribution of a Dutch translation of Tanya Grotter and the Magical Double Bass, the first of Dmitri Yemets' popular Russian series about a female apprentice wizard. Rowling and her publishers sued, arguing that the Grotter books violate copyright law. Yemets and his original Moscow-based publishers, Eksmo, argued that the books constitute a parody, permitted under copyright. The Dutch courts ruled that the books did not constitute parody and thus were not allowed to be sold in the Netherlands. Later that year, as the Dutch translation Tanja Grotter en de magische contrabas was still legal in Belgium, the Flemish publishers Roularta Books decided to print 1,000 copies (and no more) in order to let people decide whether it was plagiarism, hoping that under those circumstances Rowling and her publishers would not sue. Rowling did not sue, and the book, which Dutch people could buy by postal order from another Flemish publisher, Boekhandel VanIn, soon sold out. The books continue to be published in Russia and have spawned several sequels.

In August 2008, Warner Bros. filed a lawsuit against production company Mirchi Movies due to the similarity of the title of their Bollywood film Hari Puttar: A Comedy of Terrors to the Harry Potter film series. Mirchi Movies CEO Munish Purii claimed there is very little similarity between Hari Puttar and any elements in the Harry Potter franchise, and explained that Hari is a popular Indian name, while "puttar" means "son" in Punjabi, although Indian versions of Harry Potter also translate Harry's name to Hari Puttar. The film was delayed until late September. Warner Bros. claimed that the title was confusing, but Mirchi Movies claimed they registered the name in 2005. On 24 September 2008, the court in Delhi rejected Warner Bros.' claim, saying that Harry Potter readers were sufficiently able to distinguish between the two works. They also accused Warner Bros. of delaying the action, since they were aware of the film as far back as 2005.

== Other accusations of infringement ==
In 2000, in the lead-up to the release of the first Harry Potter film, Harry Potter and the Philosopher's Stone; Warner Bros., the film's distributor, sent a series of letters to owners of Harry Potter fansites, demanding that, to protect their copyright, they hand over their domain names. The action resulted in negative publicity for the company when the 15-year-old webmaster of the British fansite harrypotterguide.co.uk was reduced to tears by what were described by her father as unnecessary bully tactics. Eventually the corporation backed down in the face of media opposition and declared that, as the site was non-commercial, it did not violate the trademark.

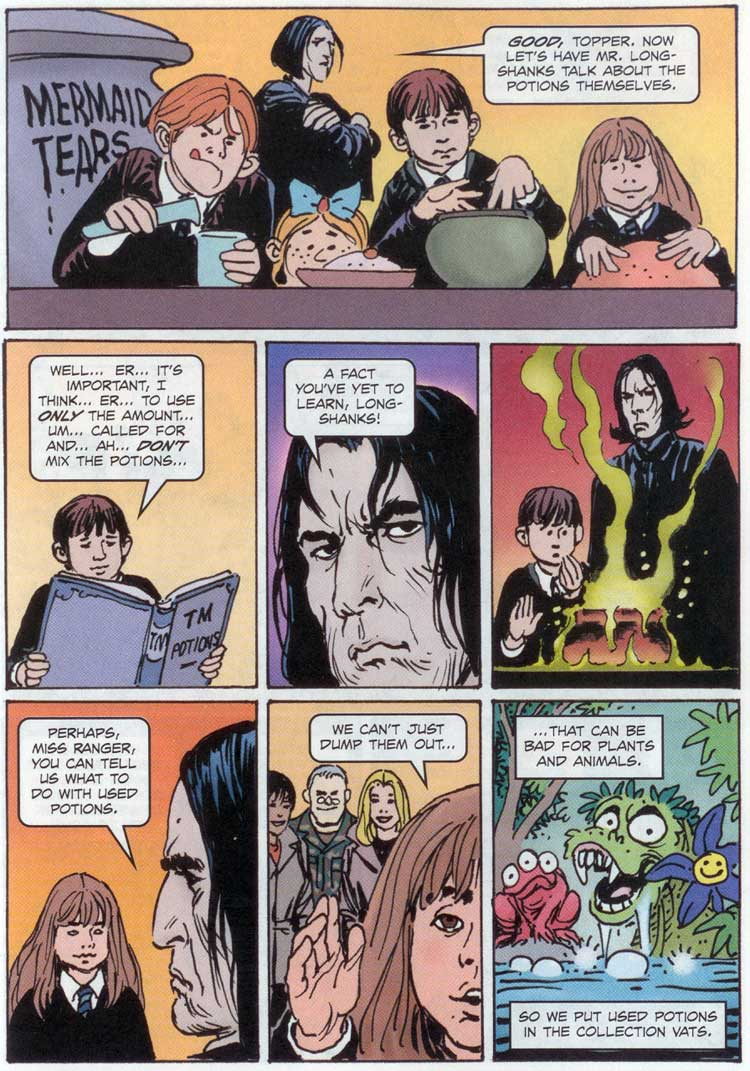
Rowling issued a notice against The Preventive Maintenance Monthly for a parody comic featuring characters similar to those in Harry Potter.

In their May 2004 issue, the US Army publication The Preventive Maintenance Monthly, which instructs soldiers on how to maintain their equipment, featured a spoof comic based on Harry Potter, featuring a character named Topper who resided at Mogmarts School under Professor Rumbledore. The publication received notice from Rowling's lawyers that the comics breached copyright, though the magazine's editor, Ken Crunk, claimed that no violation had taken place, as "[t]he drawings do not look like any of the characters from Harry Potter". After a discussion with Rowling's representatives, the magazine agreed not to use the characters again.

In 2004, Rowling and Time Warner launched legal actions against bazee.com, now the Indian branch of the online auction site eBay. The site had hosted illegally created e-books of Harry Potter, which Rowling had never agreed to be published. In 2005, Rowling warned her fans on her website that various "signed" Harry Potter memorabilia appearing for sale on eBay did not in fact use her signature. She urged her fans to protest eBay to prevent other children from being swindled. In 2007, Rowling launched lawsuits against a number of users of the site, obtaining a series of stay orders preventing them from selling her work. However eBay claimed that in her dealings with the media, Rowling had falsely claimed that her injunctions had been against eBay itself. In June 2007, eBay filed papers with the Delhi High Court, alleging that Rowling had caused them "immense humiliation and harassment". The High Court circumvented the application, claiming that it could not make such a judgment until the case went to trial.

In October 2007, Warner Bros. sued a group constructing a façade during a Hindu religious festival in the Indian city of Kolkata for ₹2 million (US$21,000), claiming that they had erected a giant replica of Harry Potter's school, Hogwarts, without their permission. Initial reports stated that, as the effort was not for profit, it did not violate Rowling's copyright. The Associated Press claimed that the High Court of Delhi, where the petition was filed, allowed the organisers to carry on with the temporary construction with an order that the structure had to be dismantled after the festival was over and that the court refused to impose any compensation on the basis that the organisers were involved in a "non-profit making enterprise". However, these statements were later retracted: the court had in fact ruled in favour of Warner Bros., but no fine had been ordered, and Warner Bros. claimed that they had only requested a fine because such action was necessary under Indian law. In November 2007, Rowling discussed the case on her website, listing the rumours that she had targeted a non-profit organisation as "Toxic" and saying, "The defendants were not religious charities, and theirs was not a religious celebration. On the contrary, it was a large-scale, commercial, sponsored event involving corporations that included a major Indian high street bank. The event was, however, set up while a Hindu festival was going on ... The court ruled that Warner Bros. rights had indeed been infringed, and that events such as the one in question would need Warner Bros.' permission in the future. The court also restrained all the defendants from any future events infringing Warner Bros. rights."

On 31 October 2007, Warner Bros. and Rowling sued Michigan-based publishing firm RDR Books to block the publication of a 400-page book version of the Harry Potter Lexicon, an online reference guide to her work. Rowling, who previously had a good relationship with Lexicon owner Steve Vander Ark, reiterated on her website that she plans to write a Harry Potter encyclopedia, and that the publication of a similar book before her own would hurt the proceeds of the official encyclopedia, which she plans to give to charity. A judge later barred publication of the book in any form until the case was resolved. In their suit, Rowling's lawyers also asserted that, as the book describes itself as a print facsimile of the Harry Potter Lexicon website, it would publish excerpts from the novels and stills from the films without offering sufficient "transformative" material to be considered a separate work. The trial concluded on 17 April 2008. On 8 September 2008, the judge ruled in her favour, claiming that the book would violate the terms of fair use. In December 2008, a modified (and shorter) version of Vander Ark's Lexicon was approved for publication and was released 16 January 2009 as The Lexicon: An Unauthorized Guide to Harry Potter Fiction.

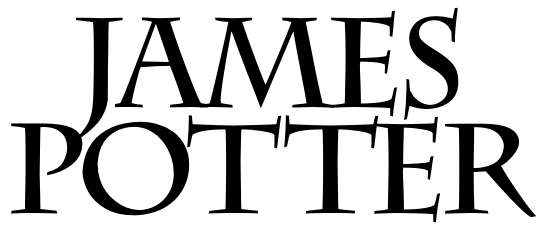
The James Potter series wordmark

In November 2007, The Scotsman reported that Rowling had threatened legal action against American computer programmer G. Norman Lippert for allegedly violating her intellectual property rights by producing and publishing the online novel James Potter and the Hall of Elders' Crossing, an unofficial and unauthorised continuation of the Harry Potter series. Written as a fan fiction project for Lippert's wife and sons, the novel is set eighteen years after the end of the last official instalment in the series, Harry Potter and the Deathly Hallows, and describes the adventures of Harry Potter's son, James Sirius Potter, during his first year at Hogwarts. A specialist in intellectual property law at Strathclyde University commented that, "If an insubstantial character from a novel is taken and built up by another author in a new story, that can be a defence against copyright infringements." However, after Lippert offered Rowling an advance copy of the novel, Rowling dismissed her threat and said she supported the novel and any others like it. Lippert subsequently produced a sequel, James Potter and the Curse of the Gatekeeper. After the novel first appeared online in early November 2007, some Harry Potter fans on the Internet initially speculated that the site might be part of an elaborate viral marketing campaign for an official continuation or spinoff of Harry Potter, one either written or at least approved by Rowling herself. On 9 November 2007, Rowling's agent Neil Blair denied that Rowling was in any way involved with the purported project, and Warner Bros., the studio which owns the rights to the Harry Potter film series, denied that the novel was in any way connected to the official Harry Potter franchise.

== Legal injunctions ==
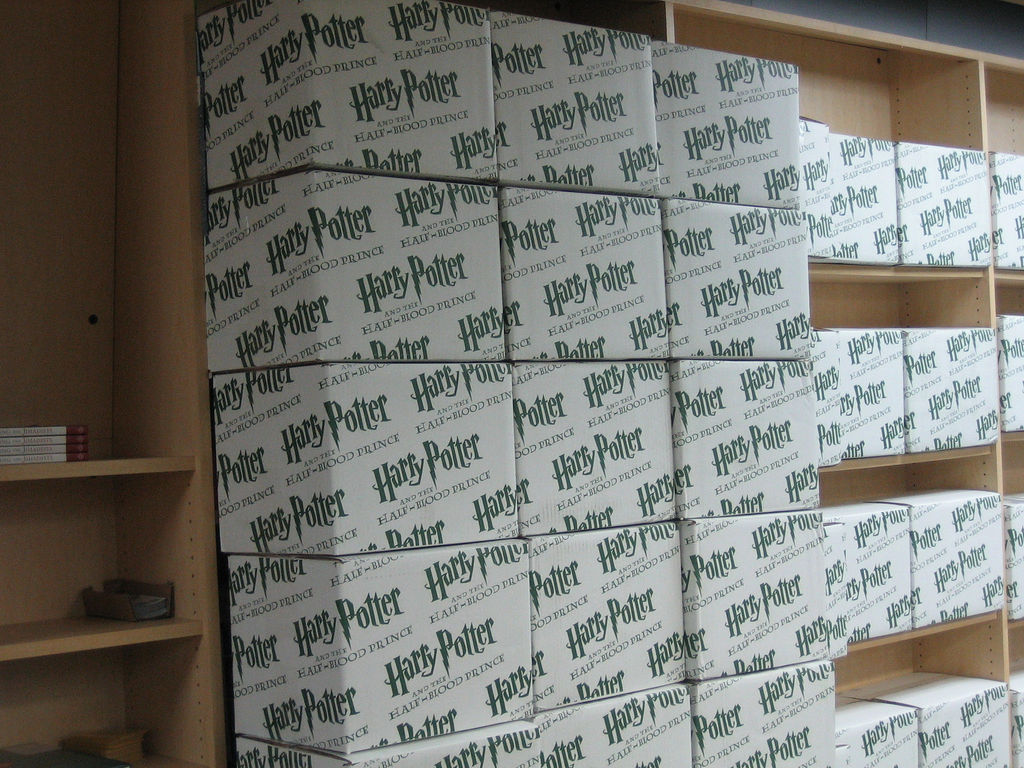
Boxes of Harry Potter and the Half-Blood Prince awaiting delivery

Rowling and her publishers have brought a series of legal injunctions to ensure the books' secrecy before their launch. These injunctions have drawn criticism from civil liberties campaigners over their potentially sweeping powers over individual freedoms.

In 2003, in an attempt to maintain secrecy over the impending release of the fifth Harry Potter book, Harry Potter and the Order of the Phoenix, Rowling and her publishers sought and received a groundbreaking injunction against "the person or persons who has or have physical possession of a copy of the said book or any part thereof without the consent of the Claimants". The ruling obtained, for the first time in British law, an injunction against unnamed or unknown individuals; before then, injunctions could only be obtained against named individuals. Lawyers Winterbothams noted that, "The new Harry Potter style injunction could be used if you expected a demonstration or trespass to take place, but which had not yet begun, so long as you could find a description for the people expected which the Court was satisfied identified 'those who are included and those who are not'". The "Potter injunction" was later used against a camp of Roma travellers. In 2006, pharmaceutical company GlaxoSmithKline employed the injunction against anonymous animal rights campaigners who had sent threatening letters to their investors.

The series garnered more controversy in 2005 with the release of the sixth book, Harry Potter and the Half-Blood Prince, when a Real Canadian Superstore grocery store accidentally sold several copies before the authorised release date. The Canadian publisher, Raincoast Books, obtained an injunction from the Supreme Court of British Columbia prohibiting the purchasers from reading the books in their possession. A comment by a media lawyer that "there is no human right to read" led to a debate in the public sphere about whether free access to information was a human right. Michael Geist, the Canada Research Chair of Internet and E-commerce Law at the University of Ottawa, said in response, "The copyright law claim was particularly puzzling. While copyright law does provide copyright owners with a basket of exclusive rights, the right to prohibit reading is not among them. In fact, copyright law has very little to say about what people can do with a book once they have purchased it." Free-speech activist Richard Stallman posted a statement on his blog calling for a boycott until the publisher issued an apology to the public. Solicitors Fraser Milner and Casgrain, who represented Raincoast and formulated the legal argument for the embargo, have rebutted this, saying that the Canadian Charter of Rights and Freedoms applies only to the government, not to private litigation, and does not offer any protection of the right to read in any case, and the innocent purchasers of the Harry Potter book had no more right to read it than if they had come into possession of someone's secret diary.

In 2007, Scholastic Corporation threatened legal action against two booksellers, Levy Home Entertainment and DeepDiscount.com, for selling copies of the final novel, Harry Potter and the Deathly Hallows, before its release date of 21 July. In an official statement, Scholastic appealed "to the Harry Potter fans who bought their books from DeepDiscount.com and may receive copies early requesting that they keep the packages hidden until midnight on 21 July." Customers who agreed not to read the book received a special Harry Potter t-shirt and a $50 coupon for Scholastic's online store.

== Blackmail ==
In June 2005, Aaron Lambert, a security guard at a book distribution centre in Corby, Northamptonshire, England, stole a number of pages from Harry Potter and the Half-Blood Prince six weeks before its intended publication date. He was arrested a day later after negotiations to sell them to John Askill, a journalist from The Sun, turned violent. Lambert reportedly fired a shot from his imitation Walther PPK pistol, but Askill was unharmed. At his trial the following October, Lambert pleaded guilty to threatening Askill and to attempting to blackmail Harry Potter's publishers, Bloomsbury. In January 2006, Lambert was sentenced to four and a half years in prison. In November 2011, in her testimony before the Leveson Inquiry, Rowling said that the Sun had attempted to "blackmail" her into a photo-op in return for returning the stolen manuscript.

== Accusation of libel ==
In July 2007, a dispute arose between Harry Potter's British publisher, Bloomsbury, and Asda, a British supermarket chain owned by the US corporation Walmart. On 15 July, a week before the release of the final Harry Potter novel, Harry Potter and the Deathly Hallows, Asda issued a press release accusing Bloomsbury of unfairly fixing their prices. Asda spokesman Peter Pritchard claimed that Bloomsbury was "holding children to ransom" and that, "[i]t seems like Bloomsbury need to do a quid-ditch as they have sent their prices up north on the Hogwarts Express. By setting the recommended retail price at this level can only be seen [sic] as blatant profiteering on their part." Pritchard went on to say that Asda was acting to "champion the right of young readers", and that the recommended retail price was "twice the average child's pocket money and £5 more than the average children's bestseller". Asda had planned to sell the book as a loss leader at £8.87, or half Bloomsbury's recommended retail price of £17.99 and below the wholesale price of £9.89.

Two days later, Bloomsbury responded that the claims were "potentially libellous" and that:

Asda's latest attempt to draw attention to themselves involves trying to leap on the Harry Potter bandwagon. This is just another example of their repeated efforts of appearing as Robin Hood in the face of controversy about their worldwide group, which would suggest they are perceived as more akin to the Sheriff of Nottingham. Loss leaders were invented by supermarkets and have nothing to do with Bloomsbury Publishing or Harry Potter and we deeply regret having been dragged into their price-wars.

Bloomsbury stated that the price hike of £1 from the previous Harry Potter novel was due to it having been printed on recycled paper. "There is a price to be paid by the consumer for environmental best practice", a Bloomsbury spokeswoman said.

Bloomsbury CEO Nigel Newton said, "[They have] unleashed a very disingenuous, self-interested attack on us. This is complete nonsense and all they're doing is grandstanding as they've done on the price of aspirin and bread. They try to turn it into a big deal as though it's a moral crusade for them, but it's nothing of the kind."

That same day, Bloomsbury cancelled all Asda's orders of Harry Potter and the Deathly Hallows, or roughly 500,000 copies, citing unpaid bills from the company totalling £38,000 for unauthorised returns of the sixth Harry Potter book. "The two matters are completely unrelated", said a Bloomsbury spokeswoman, "We decided today that we couldn't risk having arrears with anybody." The dispute had been "going on a while – going on for weeks actually." Asda responded that Bloomsbury owed them £122,000 ("for pulping and for other book trade issues and work we have done for them") and that, as one company spokesman claimed, "It just seems funny that after we expose the potty Potter price hike, Bloomsbury are trying everything they can to stop kids getting hold of Harry Potter at a price they can afford."

Asda paid the bill within hours, and claimed that Bloomsbury would be in breach of contract if it did not allow the store to sell its books. However, Bloomsbury claimed that the block on Asda's orders was still in place as, "Unfortunately, we've now had to initiate a significant libel claim against them. That matter will have to be dealt with. If they want their 500,000 books, they'll have to come and make peace with us ... It could be good news for all their disappointed customers, because they don't have to go to a soulless Asda shed to buy their book and they can share the magic of Harry Potter at an independent or specialist bookstore instead."

Upon receipt of Bloomsbury's legal letter, Asda responded that, "There is nothing defamatory in our press release. Everything there is factual. It is a commentary on how we see things." Said another Asda spokesperson, "If they don't supply us with the books, it will have a massive implication and [be] a breach of contract – but I don't think they will do that."

Later that day, however, Asda released a statement retracting its original comment: "We apologise unreservedly to Bloomsbury for [our] press release dated 15 July and withdraw our statement. We look forward to a good relationship with Bloomsbury going forward, including selling the latest Harry Potter book from 00:01 am BST on Saturday 21 July and many other Bloomsbury books in the future". In response, Bloomsbury lifted the block and Asda was allowed to sell its books. The original press release was then expunged.

The rationale behind Asda's initial press release remains uncertain. Neill Denny, commentator for thebookseller.com, opined that "the whole episode has the whiff of a badly-conceived PR stunt by ill-briefed senior executives at Asda out of touch with the subtleties of the book world." Ralph Baxter of Publishing News concurred: "For Asda ... it may be seen as mission accomplished, a high-risk strategy to maximise publicity for its Harry Potter offer rewarded with television, radio, Internet and newspaper coverage. And the association of Asda with low prices has no doubt been entrenched in a few more minds."
