= Word on the Water =

Canal boat based bookshop

Coordinates: 51°32′07″N 0°07′25″W

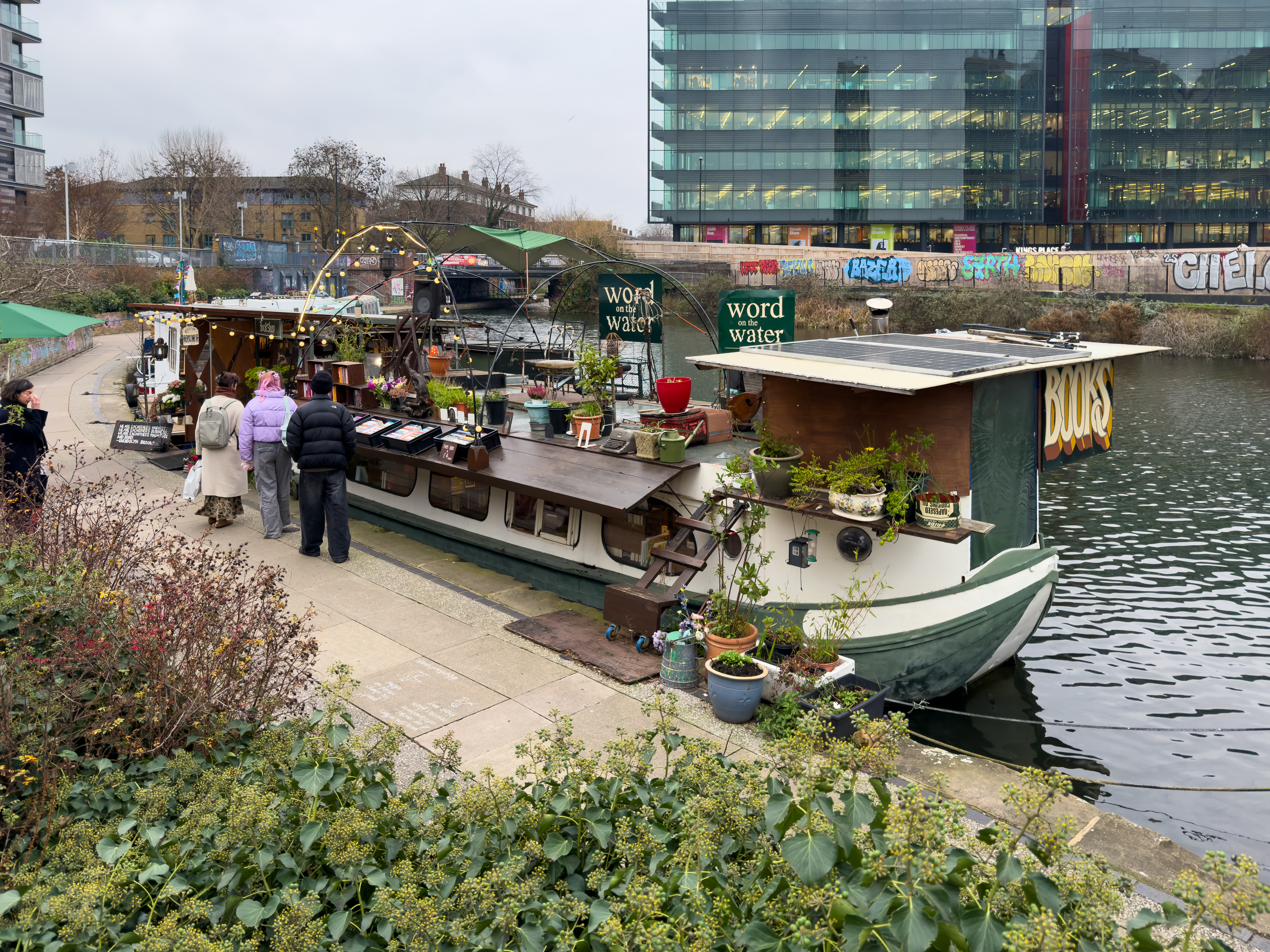
- The bookshop moored at Kings Cross in 2025
- Founded: 2010
- Founder: Paddy Screech, Jonathan Privett, and Stephane Chaudat
- Headquarters: King's Cross, London
- Services: Bookshop/Venue
- Website: www.wordonthewater.co.uk

Word on the Water is a bookshop situated on a barge that normally resides on Regent's Canal in the King's Cross area at Granary Square, London, although it has historically been based at other points along the London canal network. It has appeared in numerous publication's lists of the best bookshops in the UK including The Washington Post and The Guardian. The bookshop's home is a Dutch canal boat called Dianti dating back to the 1920s. As well as working as a bookshop, it regularly acts as a venue, hosting live music and poetry events.

== History ==
The idea for the barge came in 2011 after two of the founders (Jon and Paddy) moored their houseboats next to each other. When they tried to buy the barge off Stephane (often referred to as Noy), he became their partner in the business. Because of Canal & River Trust rules, in its early days the boat had to move regularly between different points along the canal. The boat once nearly sank on account of an accident with a valve.

As a migratory bookshop, moving every two weeks was described as being detrimental to its survival. Jonathan Privett, one of the co-founders, noted that 'People would come see it, see things they wanted to buy, see things they wanted to show their friends, they'd come back the next day and we'd be gone.' During this time, they describe having lived in a state of acute poverty, 'often choosing between coffee or cigarettes, because we couldn't have both.'

In 2014, the founders of Word on the Water applied for a permanent mooring licence from the England and Wales' Canal & River Trust for Regent's Canal in Paddington, however this was declined and instead given to British Land for the proposed creation of a coffee shop. A petition was set up, asking the Canal & Rivers Trust to provide Word on the Water with a mooring licence. Coverage looking into the dealings between a local real estate corporation and the Canal & River Trust featured in the Private Eye.

A permanent mooring was eventually granted in 2015 in King's Cross, London. This was described as an enormous relief that got rid of the need to 'literally unbuild the shop every 14 days...and rebuild it at 4'o clock in the morning'. Since then the business has been far more stable and has grown year upon year. In an interview with BookBrunch, they attributed some of their recent success to a mini book-boom and an influx of TikToks which have boosted the profile of the boat amongst both Londoners and tourists.

In 2022, the boat Dianti was refurbished and expanded, raising the roof and adding new metalwork. A feature-length documentary was made about the process.

Jonathan Privett died from cancer in September 2023. The surviving founders, Paddy and Stephane, continue to run the shop, and Megan, Jon's daughter, is now also involved with curating.

== Gallery ==
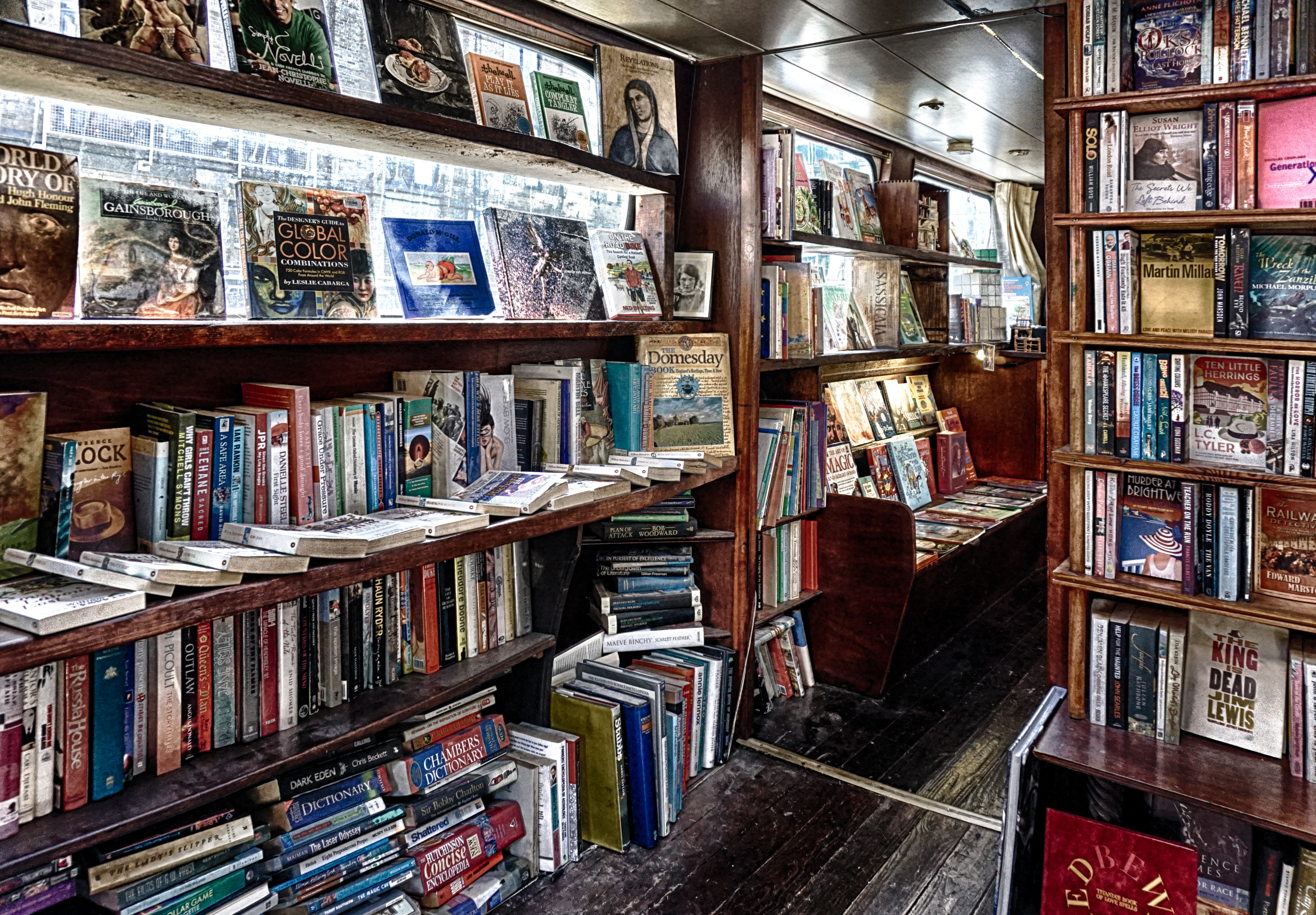
Inside of the Word on the Water's canal boat. Books sprawl across dark wooden shelves.

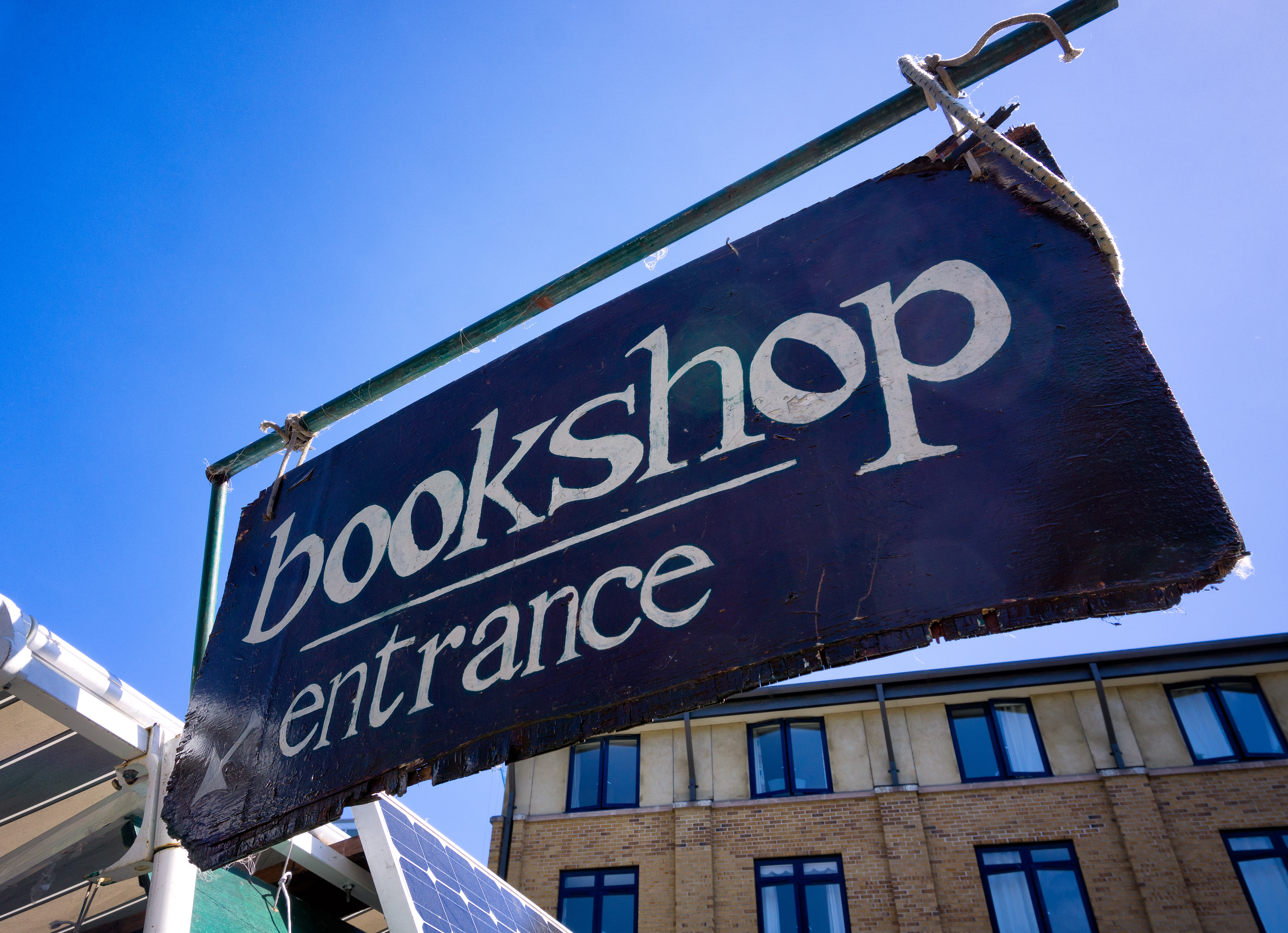
Bookshop entrance sign

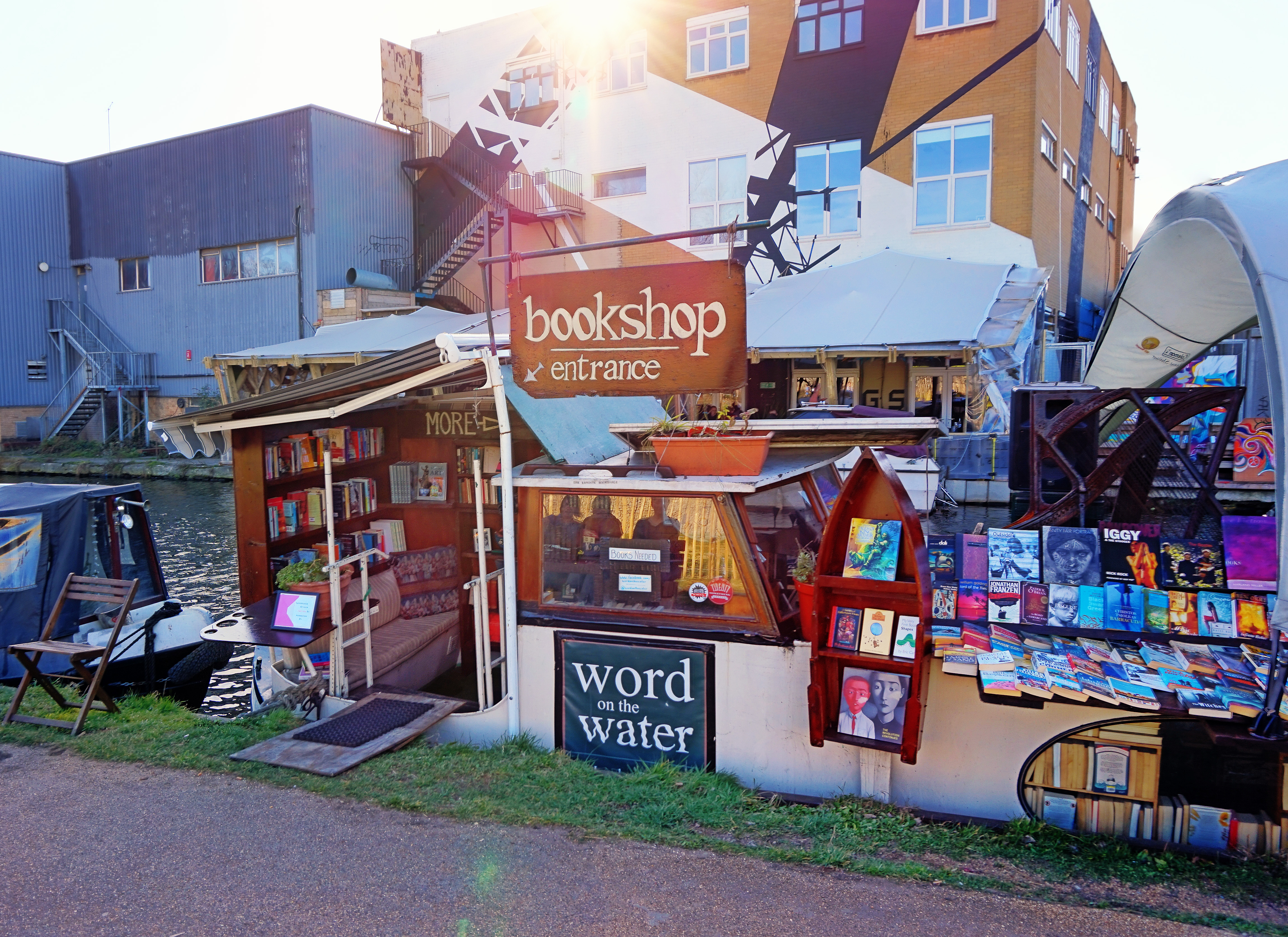
The barge on the River Lea at Hackney Wick, in 2015
