= Ottenheimer =

Ottenheimer is a surname. Notable people with the surname include:

- Albert M. Ottenheimer (1904–1980), American stage actor
- Gerry Ottenheimer (1934–1998), Canadian politician
- Helen Conway-Ottenheimer Canadian politician
- John Ottenheimer (born 1953), Canadian lawyer and politician

== See also ==
- Ottenheimer Publishers
