= My Immortal =

My Immortal can refer to:

- "My Immortal" (song), 2003 song by Evanescence
- My Immortal (fan fiction), fan-fiction novel in the Harry Potter universe
