= The Eye of Argon =

1970 fantasy novella by Jim Theis

- Cover of the 2006 paperback edition
- Author: Jim Theis
- Language: English
- Genre: Heroic fantasy
- Publisher: Wildside Press (2006 reprint)
- Publication date: 21 August 1970
- Publication place: US
- Media type: Print (magazine, 1970; chapbook, 1987; trade paperback, 2006)
- Pages: 23 in zine, 52 and 76 in book editions
- ISBN: 0-8095-6261-8
- OCLC: 71347850

The Eye of Argon is a 1970 sword and sorcery fantasy novelette by Jim Theis (1953–2002) that narrates the adventures of the barbarian Grignr. It has been notorious within the science fiction and fantasy fandoms since its publication, described variously as "one of the genre's most beloved pieces of appalling prose", the "infamous 'worst fantasy novel [sic] ever' published for fans' enjoyment", and "the apotheosis of bad writing". Science fiction conventions have long held group readings of the work in which participants are challenged to read it aloud for extended periods without laughing.

== History ==
=== Writing and publication ===
The Eye of Argon was written by Jim Theis, a St. Louis, Missouri, science fiction fan, at age 16. The work was first published in 1970 in OSFAN 10, the fanzine of the Ozark Science Fiction Association. Theis was described by David Langford in SFX as "a malaprop genius, a McGonagall of prose with an eerie gift for choosing the wrong word and then misapplying it". Many misspellings also arose from the fanzine transcription's poor typing. Theis was not completely happy with the published version and continued to work on the story. In an interview published three months later, he said:

In fact, I have changed it. I went over it for an independent study for English in school. You know, like adjectives changed and places where sentences should be deleted; things of this type. Even so it is nothing to be proud of and yet it is. Because how many people have had their first story published at 16—even if it is in a fanzine or a clubzine? How many writers have written a complete story at so early an age? Even so, "Eye of Argon" isn't great. I basically don't know much about structure or composition.

=== Spread and notoriety ===
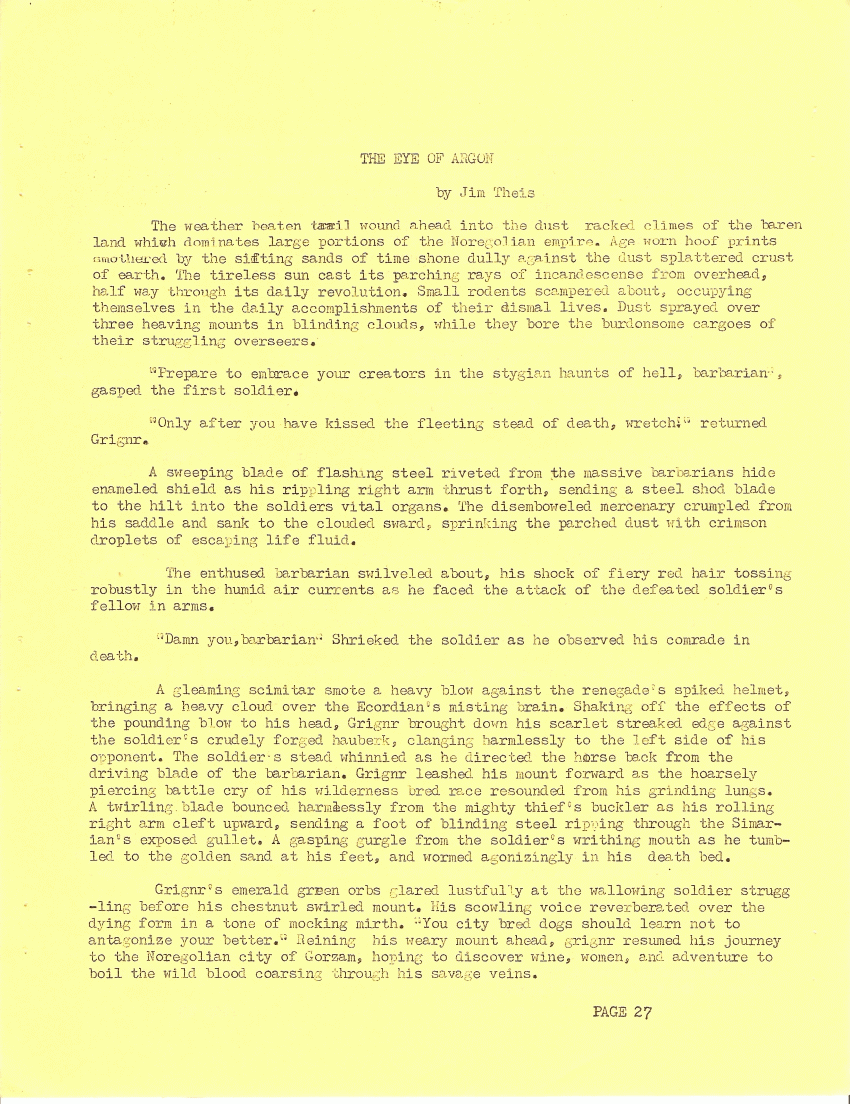
The Eye of Argon original appearance in OSFAN, 1970

Sometime in the 1970s, science fiction author Thomas N. Scortia obtained a copy of The Eye of Argon, which he mailed to horror novelist Chelsea Quinn Yarbro. Yarbro wrote to Darrell Schweitzer in 2003:

Tom Scortia sent me the fanzine pages as a kind of shared amusement, since both of us tended to look for poor use of language in stories. Don Simpson and I were still married then, and one of our entertainments was reading aloud to each other. This work was such a mish-mash that we took turns reading it to each other until we could stand no more...
About two weeks after the story arrived, we had a dinner party, mainly for MWA (Mystery Writers of America) and book dealer friends, and Joe Gores got to talking about some of the really hideous language misuse he had seen in recent anthology submissions and had brought along a few of the most egregious. I mentioned I had something that put his examples in the shade, and brought out "The Eye of Argon". It was a huge hit. [Locus reviewer] Tom Whitmore asked if he could make a copy of it, and I loaned it to him, and readings of it started to become a hideous entertainment. I never typed out a copy of it, but I am afraid I did start the ball rolling.

The work was copied and distributed widely around science fiction fandom, often uncredited. Readings quickly became a common activity at science fiction conventions: "People sit in a circle and take turns reading from photocopies of the story. The reader's turn is over when he begins to laugh uncontrollably."

=== Later editions ===
An edition of The Eye of Argon was published in 1987 by Hypatia Press, illustrated by Lynne Adams (ISBN 0-940841-10-X). The story was also reprinted in 1995, attributed to "G. Ecordian", as a nod to the story's protagonist.

Later, a version became available on the Internet, ARGON.DOC, which was manually transcribed by Don Simpson and placed online by Doug Faunt. It bears this note at the bottom:

No mere transcription can give the true flavor of the original printing of The Eye of Argon. It was mimeographed with stencils cut on an elite manual typewriter. Many letters were so faint as to be barely readable, others were overstruck, and some that were to be removed never got painted out with correction fluid. Usually, only one space separated sentences, while paragraphs were separated by a blank line and were indented ten spaces. Many words were grotesquely hyphenated. And there were illustrations—I cannot do them justice in mere words, but they were a match for the text. These are the major losses of this version (#02) of TEoA.
Otherwise, all effort has been made to retain the full and correct text, preserving even mis-spellings and dropped spaces. An excellent proofreader has checked it for errors both omitted and committed. What mismatches remain are mine.

However, the online version was found to contain errors when an original copy of the fanzine was discovered in Temple University's Paskow Science Fiction Collection in 2003.

=== Finding the lost ending ===
The ending of The Eye of Argon was missing from Scortia's copy and all the copies made of it. The last page of the story was on the last sheet of the fanzine, which had fallen off the staples. The online version ended with the phrase "-END OF AVAILABLE COPY-". The original copy found in 2003 was also incomplete.

The ending was considered lost until a complete copy of the fanzine was discovered by librarian Gene Bundy at the Jack Williamson Science Fiction Library at Eastern New Mexico University in 2005. Bundy reported the discovery to Lee Weinstein, who had found the Temple University copy, and subsequently published the article "In Search of Jim Theis" in The New York Review of Science Fiction issue 195.

In 2006, Wildside Press published a paperback edition of the complete work.

== Plot summary ==
The story commences with a sword fight between the barbarian Grignr and the mercenaries who are pursuing him. After killing them, Grignr resumes his journey to the city of Gorzom. After bedding a prostitute there, he kills a soldier in a fight. Arrested by the soldier's comrades, he is brought before Agaphim, a decadent and unintelligent local prince, who condemns him to forced labor for life. Grignr is knocked unconscious when he attempts to fight his way out, and later awakens in an underground cell.

The narrative shifts to a group of "shamen" [sic] who are preparing to sacrifice a young woman to an idol of their god Argon, whose single eye is represented by a "red emerald" known as the Eye of Argon. The woman deliberately vomits on the head shaman and kicks him in the testicles. Enraged, the other shamans molest her.

Meanwhile, Grignr has escaped his cell and is now wandering the dungeons beneath the palace. Hearing a cry from below, he opens a trap door and finds the sacrifice about to take place. Grignr attacks and massacres the priests, steals the Eye, and he and the woman escape the dungeons. He discovers that Carthena, the intended sacrificial victim, was the prostitute he had encountered earlier. A priest, having recovered from a epileptic seizure he had during Grignr's attack, follows the pair, armed with a scimitar. He is killed by a booby trap Grignr had found and reset. Near the entrance to the surface, Grignr and Carthena then find Agaphim and his advisor, whom they kill.

Grignr takes out the Eye to admire it. In sunlight, the Eye transforms into a leech-like blob which sucks Grignr's blood. He destroys the blob by thrusting a torch at it, whereupon it explodes. Grignr leaves Gorzom with Carthena.

== Readings ==
Reading The Eye of Argon aloud has been made into a game, as described by SF critic Dave Langford in SFX magazine: "The challenge of death, at SF conventions, is to read The Eye of Argon aloud, straight-faced, without choking and falling over. The grandmaster challenge is to read it with a squeaky voice after inhaling helium. What fun we fans have." To encourage the game, a "Competitive Reading Edition" of the story is freely available, which is a careful copy of the original publication.

== Author ==
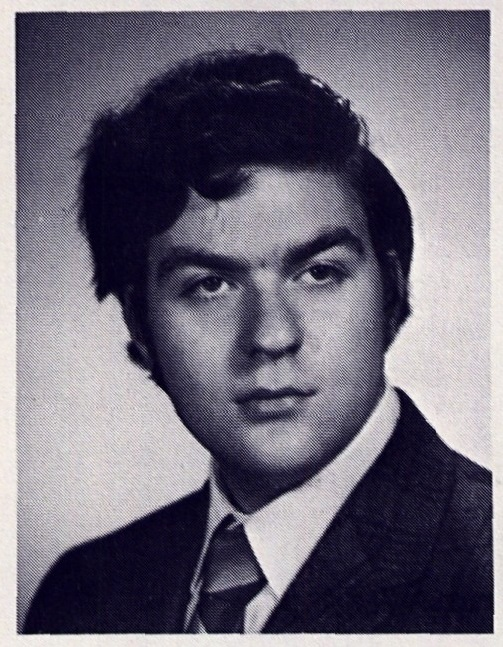
Jim Theis, author of The Eye of Argon, 1971 yearbook photo

James Francis "Jim" Theis (pronounced [ˈtaɪs]; August 9, 1953 – March 26, 2002) wrote The Eye of Argon at age 16. It was published in the Ozark Science Fiction Association fanzine on August 21, 1970, a few days after his seventeenth birthday. He published one more fantasy story, "The Sacred Crest", a sequel to The Eye of Argon, in the fanzine Son of Grafan in 1972, and later pursued and earned a degree in journalism. He married and was the father of two boys, and his hobbies included collecting books, comics, and German swords. He also collected, traded, and sold tapes of radio programs of the 1930s, '40s, and '50s under the business name The Phantom of Radio Past. After his death at age 48, his family requested donations to the American Heart Association.

In an interview on Hour 25 (the presenters of which would periodically stage a reading of The Eye of Argon) in 1984, Theis stated that he was hurt that his story was being mocked and vowed never to write again. In a later interview, he complained about being mocked for something he had written thirty years ago, at age sixteen. However, he did participate in readings of the story in St. Louis at the Archon convention. A copy of the 1995 reprinting was sent to him, with no response.

=== Other attributed authors and distributors ===
Before copies of the original fanzine were rediscovered, the story's authorship was in doubt. Because the novelette was at least once re-typed and photocopied for distribution without any stated provenance, many readers were convinced that the story was either a collaborative effort, satire, or both. A now-defunct site called "Wulf's 'Eye of Argon' Shrine" argued that the story "was actually well paced and plotted", and noted that "at least one sf professional today claims that the story was a cunning piece of satire passed off as real fan fiction".

David Langford reported the following, sent in by author Michael Swanwick, in Ansible #193:

I had a surprising conversation at Readercon with literary superstar Samuel R. Delany, who told me of how at an early Clarion the students and teachers had decided to see exactly how bad a story they could write if they put their minds to it. Chip [Delany] himself contributed a paragraph to the round robin effort. Its title? The Eye of Argon.

Author Stephen Goldin said that, during a convention, he met a woman who told him she had done the actual mimeographing for the OSFAN publication. Lee Weinstein reports that he had originally heard that Dorothy Fontana had distributed the photocopies. Weinstein, however, later discovered Usenet posts by Richard W. Zellich, who was involved in running the St. Louis–area convention Archon. Zellich reported in 1991 posts that Jim Theis was real and attended the convention several times.

What Weinstein calls "the smoking gun" with regard to Theis' authorship was a 1994 posting from New York fan Richard Newsome, who transcribed an interview with Theis published in OSFAN 13. The interviewer praised Theis, saying, "When they were kidding you about it, you took it so well....You showed real character." Theis replied, "I mean, it was easier than showing bad character and inviting trouble."

== See also ==
- My Immortal, a 2006–2007 Harry Potter work of fanfic with a similar reputation
- Amanda McKittrick Ros, novelist whose work has also been read aloud in similar competitions.
- Sword and sorcery
- Chuck Tingle, erotic fantasy novelist known for deliberately bizarre work.
