= Wolfstar =

Pair of Harry Potter fictional characters

In the Marauders fandom, Wolfstar, also known as Remus Lupin/Sirius Black, is the pairing of the fictional characters Sirius Black and Remus Lupin from the Harry Potter franchise. It is a form of shipping in the Marauders fandom.

== Background and popularity ==
Despite being non-canonical, the slash pairing is popular within the fandom. As of August 2026, the pairing had over 72,000 individual works on fanfiction repository Archive of Our Own. In 2023 alone, 9,806 individual works depicting the pairing were published on the site, making it the second most written pairing on the site for that year, behind "Ineffable Husbands", the pairing of Aziraphale and Crowley from the Good Omens fandom. It has the second most written works for a pairing of this fandom, after Drarry, another non-canonical slash pairing. David Thewlis and Gary Oldman, who portrayed Remus Lupin and Sirius Black the film adaptations, and Alfonso Cuarón, who directed the film adaptation of Harry Potter and the Prisoner of Azkaban, have all stated that they interpret Lupin to be gay.

When Lupin was first introduced in the series, many fans presumed the character to be queer-coded. Franchise author J. K. Rowling herself later confirmed that Lupin's lycanthropy was a metaphor for HIV/AIDS. However, by the seventh book in the series, Rowling had begun depicting Lupin as in a traditional marriage with children with Nymphadora Tonks, another character who several fans previously believed to have been queer-coded. This decision received backlash from those in support of the pairing between Lupin and Black. Writer Aja Romano of Vox noted that some of the backlash was "misogynistic". However, even after Tonks was made Lupin's canonical love interest, fans of the "Wolfstar" pairing began interpreting Lupin as bisexual instead. In July 2015, Rowling published a "biography" of Lupin on the Pottermore website confirming that before falling in love with Tonks, Lupin "had never fallen in love before". Despite the canonicity of the relationship between Lupin and Tonks, the pairing between Black and Lupin remains far more popular.

Some fans of the pairing choose to interpret both characters as being adoptive fathers or uncles to the franchise's protagonist Harry Potter, who was orphaned as an infant. An example of a written piece of fanwork that depicts this interpretation is Stealing Harry, in which Lupin and Black take custody of Potter from the abusive Dursley household and raise him themselves. Other popular fanworks depicting the pairing include All The Young Dudes, The Shoebox Project, and The Cadence of Part-time Poets.

== Analysis ==
According to Jacquelin Elliott of the University of Florida, the canonical long friendship between the two characters is a factor in the pairing's popularity, with its fans interpreting their relationship as akin to that of an 'old married couple'. Other factors include the "undeveloped" canonical romantic relationship between Lupin and Tonks and the lack of attachment to any female character from Sirius. Another major factor in the ship's popularity is Lupin's lycanthropy, as well as Black's status as a canine Animagus, a form of shape-shifter. Elliott wrote: "For many fans, Remus’ lycanthropy (and Sirius’ status as a canine animagus) were central to their readings of the characters as queer, each man's human/animal hybridity heightening their respective positions as liminal figures with disallowable sexuality." She further notes: "Part of the pairing’s appeal and, indeed, the appeal of many other such ‘monstrous’ couples, is the potential for expressions of queer, disallowable, and even impossible sexual practices that their fantastical bodies allow", and that common tropes for erotic works that emphasize the animalistic aspects of both characters include "Mpreg", "heat fics", "mating for life" and bestiality. However, she also writes that "not all Remus/Sirius fanfiction concerns itself with these more hyper-animalistic forms of sex" and that fanworks depicting the pairing "runs the gamut from the aforementioned explicit pornography to light, even saccharine, romance (or ‘fluff’) and it is crucial to recognize that fics not including these tropes are no less concerned with Remus’ lycanthropy and, in many ways, no less radical." Elliott argues that the reason Lupin's lycanthropy features so prominently in many works depicting the pairing is that his status as a lycanthrope "brands his sexuality as disallowable."

While Rowling did not explicitly portray the pairing as romantic in the novels, many fans of the pairing interpret it as canonical. Several lines and additions from the film adaptations that are not present in the novels, such as character Severus Snape accusing both characters of bickering like an "old married couple" or Black embracing Lupin in spite of his lycanthropy, may play into such readings by fans of the pairing. Other fans may accept the pairing as non-canonical and support it in spite of its lack of canonicity. With regards to the Pottermore "biography", Elliott argues that Rowling had "foreclosed alternate readings and, in doing so, indeed filled in spaces where queer fans had been able to carve out a representative place for themselves", and that she had "dashed hopes that, for once, a queer-coded monster might actually be queer, which would have granted queer fans one small piece of representation that was not only ever counter-textual." According to Romano, a significant portion of fans of the pairing "believed Rowling had taken the two queerest characters in the series, de-gayed them, and stuck them together in a child-producing heteronormative union."

Laura Muth of The Mary Sue argued that Lupin and Black parallel "Stucky", the pairing of the Marvel Comics characters Captain America and Bucky Barnes. Muth noted that both Sirius and Bucky disappear from the other's life for years before resurfacing as a villain, and that they are "all deeply developed characters as individuals", with none of the characters being "simply a vehicle for another's development." However, Muth also notes that while Sirius was wrongly-accused of his crimes, while Bucky "turned out to be under the influence of an invasive mind-control experiment that erased his memories and his former sense of right and wrong."
