= Singularity Rising =

Book by James D. Miller

Singularity Rising: Surviving and Thriving in a Smarter, Richer, and More Dangerous World
- Author: James D. Miller
- Publisher: BenBella Books
- Publication date: October 16, 2012
- Media type: Paperback
- Pages: 288
- ISBN: 9781936661657

Singularity Rising: Surviving and Thriving in a Smarter, Richer, and More Dangerous World is a book by James D. Miller that covers a broad spectrum of topics associated with the technological singularity, including cognitive enhancement and AI.
