= Ottenheimer Publishers =

American publishing company

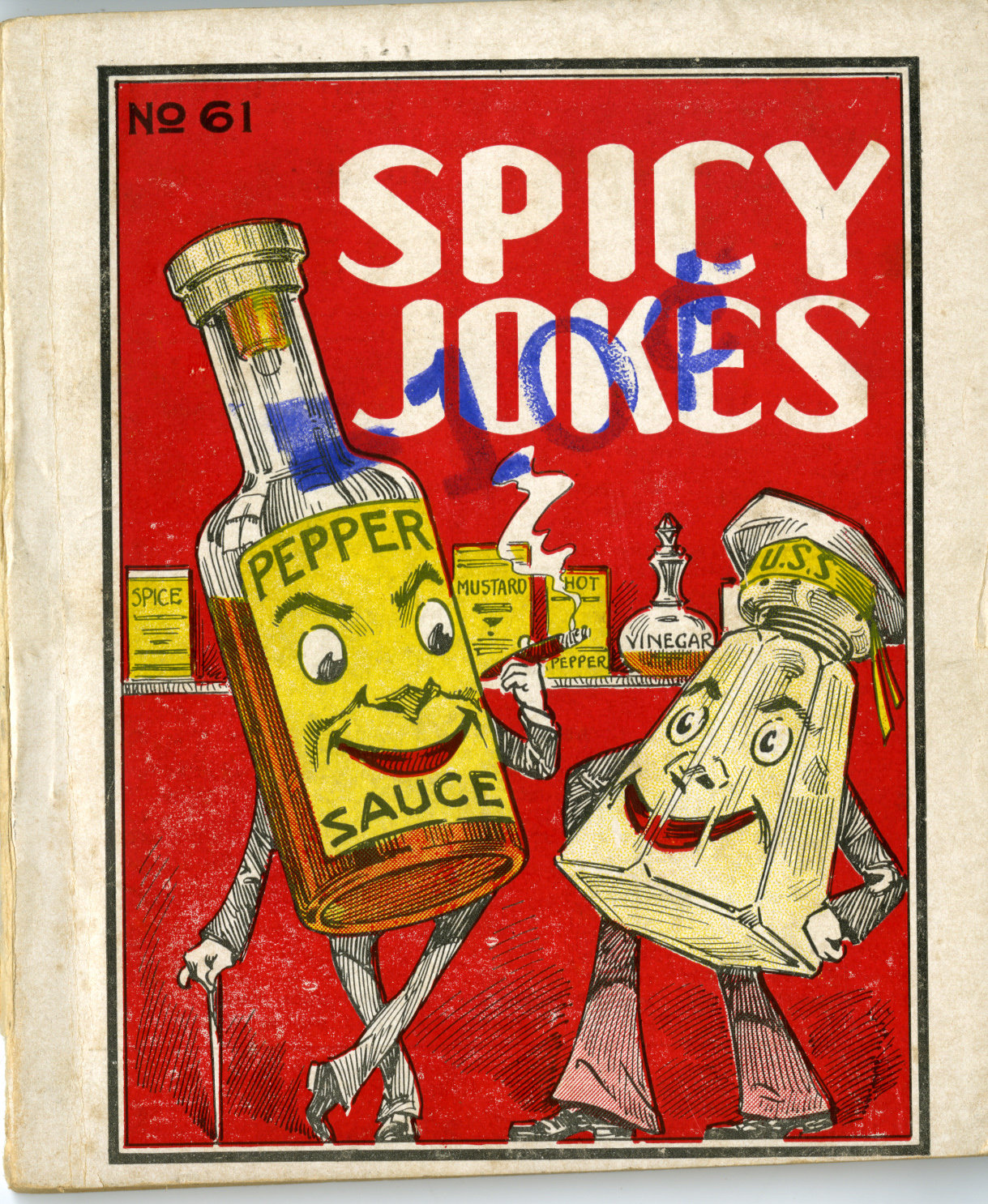
An example of a joke book circa 1915 created by Ottenheimer Publishers. From the collection at the George Peabody Library.

Ottenheimer Publishers, Inc. was a Baltimore, Maryland, publisher founded in 1890.

The publisher was primarily a packager known for children's books, especially pop-up and board books, as well as cookbooks. It was a printer for Time Magazine. It also republished the works of Nancy Stouffer. Stouffer authored The Legend of Rah and the Muggles as well as Larry Potter and His Best Friend Lilly. She filed an unsuccessful trademark infringement lawsuit in 2000 against Harry Potter author J.K. Rowling and U.S. publisher Scholastic.

In the 1980s Ottenheimer Publishers was the U.S. publisher of the Mr. Men and Little Miss books with U.S. distribution by Price Stern Sloan, and later Price Stern Sloan acquired 100% of the U.S. rights.

== History ==
Ottenheimer Publishers was founded in 1890 by brothers Isaac and Moses Ottenheimer while they were both still in their teens. Per family legend, the business began with a one hundred dollar loan from an aunt. The Ottenheimer brothers could use the funds toward any business of their choosing, provided it did not interfere with the Sabbath. Though their business originally centered on selling remaindered books, they soon made a name for themselves by selling compilations of joke books, parlor games, and fortune-telling manuals. The joke books in particular were quite popular, with some estimates that over one million copies were sold; compact and retailing for ten cents, they were cheap and portable. The brothers later admitted that the jokes they published were not original; instead, they would have one of their employees attend performances by leading comedians and write down the jokes that received the best audience reaction. The joke books were often thematically arranged, with books devoted to topics such as ethnic humor, married life, and the then-modern automobile. The joke books sold well until the early 1930s, at which time the company began to produce reference works and cookbooks. The printing plates used for producing the joke books were donated to scrap drives during World War II.

The company filed for bankruptcy in November 2001 and closed in 2002.

== See also ==
- Legal disputes over the Harry Potter series
