= Dmitri Yemets =

Russian writer

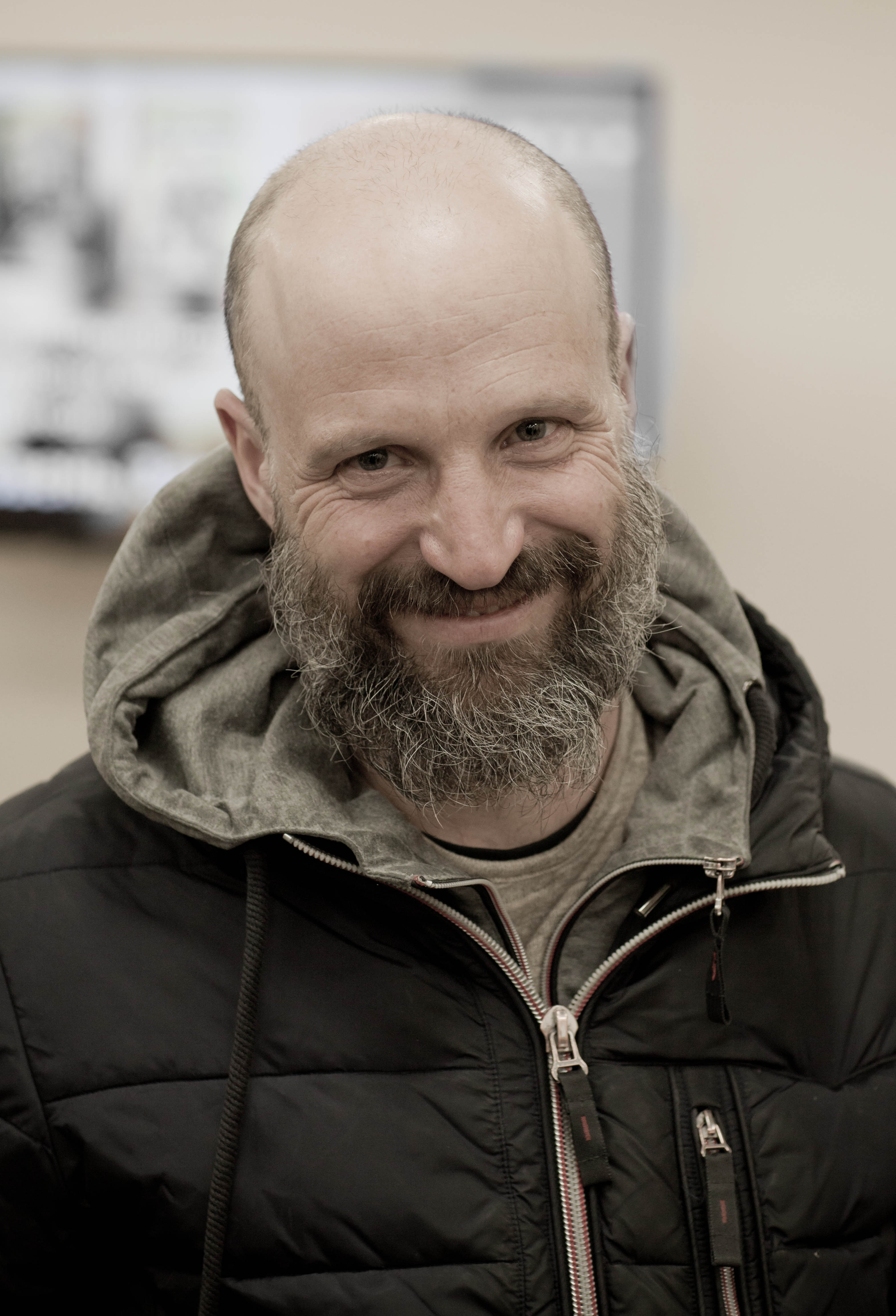
- Born: 27 March 1974 (age 52) Moscow, RSFSR, USSR
- Occupation: writer
- Spouse: Maria
- Children: 7

Dmitri Aleksandrovich Yemets (Russian: Дми́трий Алекса́ндрович Емец, born 27 March 1974) is a Russian author of children's and young adult fantasy literature.

== Career ==
He is most famous for his Tanya Grotter series and spin-offs, which he calls "a parody" or, alternatively, as "a sort of Russian answer" to Harry Potter. He has been repeatedly threatened by J.K. Rowling to be sued; however, the books still are very popular, with the first, The Magic Double Bass, selling about 100,000 copies. Despite speculation of a film version, none has been made to date, likely for legal reasons. However, a play based on the books was performed at bookstores following the release of the ninth installation. After the third book, "Tanya Grotter" stopped being a parody and became an independent book cycle.

He is the author of cycles "Tanya Grotter", "Methodius Buslaev", "Filja Hitditch", "Space pirate Krox", and "Mutants".

He once said that "The story with the legal dispute is not pleasant for me. However, I think that the fact that J.K. Rowling’s lawyers went to court implies the fact of weakness. I hope that Tanya Grotter will become stronger at court."

== Personal life ==
Yemets is married and has seven children. His English blog provides links to English translation of some of his books.
