= Tanya Grotter =

- First appearance: Tanya Grotter and the Magical Double Bass
- Created by: Dmitri Yemets

Tanya Grotter (Russian: Таня Гроттер) is the protagonist of a Russian fantasy novel series written by Dmitri Yemets. The first book of the series, Tanya Grotter and the Magical Double Bass, was first published on January 1, 2002. Tanya (short for Tatiana) Grotter is an orphan with intentional resemblances to J. K. Rowling's Harry Potter character. Despite its reputation in Russia and the many books it has spawned, the series is not available in English translation because the first book was judged a breach of copyright.

== Content ==
The central character and plot elements of the first novel, Tanya Grotter and the Magical Double Bass, are a humorous parody of Harry Potter and the Philosopher's Stone transposed into a Russian setting. Tanya Grotter has an unusual birthmark on her nose, magical powers, an upbringing by "Lopukhoid" (equivalent to Muggle) relatives after her parents were killed by an evil sorceress Chuma-del-Tort (the official translation of Voldemort's name in Russian was 'Volan-de-Mort'), and goes to study at the Tibidokhs (Тибидохс) School for Behaviorally-Challenged Young Witches and Wizards. Tanya's foster-family, the Durnevs, live in an urban apartment block, and Tanya is forced to sleep not in a cupboard but in the apartment's loggia.

Yemets described the books as "a cultural reply" to the Potter series, and they feature allusion to Russian culture and folklore such as Baba Yaga, rusalki, witches on Bald Mountain and the works of Pushkin (for instance, Tibidox is on the island of Buyan mentioned in Pushkin's The Tale of Tsar Saltan).

After the first book, the plots diverge from those of the Harry Potter series. For instance, in Tanya Grotter and the Golden Leech, Tanya finds herself pitted against "Hurry Pooper" (a thinly disguised Harry Potter) in the World Dragonball Championship. While trying to reach the ball, they crash, creating a new timeline in which Chuma-del-Tort has won, good and evil being reversed, and all the characters are speaking a Russian equivalent of Orwellian Newspeak. To restore normality, Tanya must defeat the Golden Leech.

== Legal history ==
While the series is legally published in Russia, it is not available in translation due to a lawsuit on behalf of J. K. Rowling and Time Warner. Having failed to obtain a cease and desist order in Russia, Rowling and Time Warner targeted publication in the Netherlands, where first translations of international editions are commonly published. In 2003, courts there prevented the distribution of a Dutch translation of the first in the series, Tanya Grotter and the Magical Double Bass, after Rowling and Time Warner's lawyers issued a cease and desist order, arguing that the Grotter books violated copyright law, specifically infringing on Rowling's right to control derivative works. Yemets and his Moscow-based publishers, Eksmo, argued unsuccessfully that the book constituted a parody, permitted under copyright.

Later that year, as the Dutch translation Tanja Grotter en de magische contrabas was still legal in Belgium, the Flemish publishers Roularta Books decided to print 1,000 copies (and no more) in order to let people decide whether it was plagiarism, hoping that under those circumstances Rowling and her publishers would not sue.

== Subsequent history ==
In 2003, after the first five books, the total circulation of Tanya Grotter books reached one million. As of 2006 the figure, including spinoffs, was approaching three million. In a 2006 interview, Yemets said that he had moved on to "urban absurd comic genre fantasy" with the Buslaev series, but that there was still reader demand, and sufficient material, for an 11th Tanya book. He described the series as a purely Russian phenomenon, dependent on the language and culture, and commented that he would not place much faith in Tanya living a full life if she were brought to the playing field of Europe or America. Ian Dooley, in his review from Princeton University, points out that perhaps by reading Tanya Grotter readers can decide for themselves "whether or not the series is a parody or a piracy".

In 2006, Yemets' books featured in the 10 best children's books of 2006 in a reader's poll at the Pushkin Central Children's Library, Saint Petersburg. In July 2006, his Tanya Grotter and the Pearl Ring was the highest-selling children's book in Russia (his Methodius Buslaev: Vengeance of the Valkyries was No. 10, while J. K. Rowling's Harry Potter and the Half-Blood Prince and Harry Potter and the Order of the Phoenix ranked No. 2 and No. 6.

== Titles ==
From the Tanya Grotter official site:

1. Tanya Grotter and the Magical Double Bass (Таня Гроттер и магический контрабас)
2. Tanya Grotter and the Disappearing Floor (Таня Гроттер и исчезающий этаж)
3. Tanya Grotter and the Golden Leech (Таня Гроттер и Золотая Пиявка)
4. Tanya Grotter and the Throne of Drevnir (Таня Гроттер и трон Древнира)
5. Tanya Grotter and the Pikestaff of the Magi (Таня Гроттер и посох волхвов)
6. Tanya Grotter and the Hammer of Perun (Таня Гроттер и молот Перуна)
7. Tanya Grotter and the Pince-nez of Noah (Таня Гроттер и пенсне Ноя)
8. Tanya Grotter and the Boots of the Centaur (Таня Гроттер и ботинки кентавра)
9. Tanya Grotter and the Well of Poseidon (Таня Гроттер и колодец Посейдона)
10. Tanya Grotter and the Curl of Aphrodite (Таня Гроттер и локон Афродиты)
11. Tanya Grotter and the Pearl Ring (Таня Гроттер и перстень с жемчужиной)
12. Tanya Grotter and the Curse of the Necromage (Таня Гроттер и проклятье некромага)
13. Tanya Grotter and the Garrulous Sphinx (Таня Гроттер и болтливый сфинкс)
14. Tanya Grotter and the bird of Titans (Таня Гроттер и птица титанов)

Spinoff titles:

1. Tanya Grotter and the Complete Tibidox! Phrases, Quotations and Aphorisms (Таня Гроттер и полный Тибидохс! Фразочки, цитатки и афоризмы)
2. Worlds of Tanya Grotter (Миры Тани Гроттер) - a compilation of fan-written graphic novels

There are several other spin-offs from the Tanya Grotter series. The Methodius Buslaev (Мефодий Буслаев) series, featuring a young male magician, and the Hooligan fantasy (Хулиганское фэнтези) series:

1. Methodius Buslaev. Magician of Midnight (Мефодий Буслаев. Маг полуночи)
2. Methodius Buslaev. Roll of Desire (Мефодий Буслаев. Свиток желаний)
3. Methodius Buslaev. Third Rider of the Gloom (Мефодий Буслаев. Третий всадник мрака)
4. Methodius Buslaev. Ticket to the Bald Mountain (Мефодий Буслаев. Билет на лысую гору)
5. Methodius Buslaev. Vengeance of the Valkyries (Мефодий Буслаев. Месть валькирий)
6. Methodius Buslaev. Depressnyak's Secret Magic (Мефодий Буслаев. Тайная магия Депресcняка)
7. Methodius Buslaev. Tartarus's Ice and Flame (Мефодий Буслаев. Лед и пламя Тартара)
8. Methodius Buslaev. The First Eydos (Мефодий Буслаев. Первый Эйдос)
9. Methodius Buslaev. Wings of Light for the Dark Guard (Мефодий Буслаев. Светлые крылья для тёмного стража)
10. Methodius Buslaev. Stairway to Eden (Мефодий Буслаев. Лестница в Эдем)
11. Methodius Buslaev. The map of Chaos (Мефодий Буслаев. Карта Хаоса)
12. Methodius Buslaev. Dryad's necklace (Мефодий Буслаев. Ожерелье дриады)
13. Methodius Buslaev. Glass guard (Мефодий Буслаев. Стеклянный страж)
1. Hooligan fantasy: Great Something (Хулиганское фэнтези: Великое нечто)

== Similarities ==
The Dutch court found the following similarities between Harry Potter and Tanya Grotter:

Harry Potter	Tanya Grotter
Harry's parents are killed by an evil wizard, Voldemort (in Russian translation, Volan-de-Mort)	Tanya's parents are killed by an evil witch, Chuma-del-Tort
He thinks they were killed in a car crash	She thinks her mother was killed in an avalanche, and her father is in prison
He has a mysterious scar on the forehead	She has a mysterious birthmark on the nose
He is left on the doorstep of his aunt and uncle, Vernon and Petunia Dursley	She is left on the doorstep of her second cousins, Ninel and Germain Durnev
They treat him poorly, spoiling their own son Dudley Dursley	They treat her poorly, spoiling their own daughter Penelopa ("Pipa")
When he is 11, having no previous knowledge of his powers, he is invited to Hogwarts, a school for wizards and witches	When she is 10, having no previous knowledge of her powers, she is invited to Tibidox, a school for difficult-to-raise mages
The remote Hogwarts can only be reached by train from a secret platform	The remote Tibidox can only be reached by flying or teleportation
He makes two special friends	She makes two special friends
He becomes an outstanding player of Quidditch, flying on a broom	She becomes an outstanding player of Dragonball, flying on a double bass
Voldemort seeks the Philosopher's Stone, hidden at Hogwarts	Chuma-Del-Tort seeks an amulet, which turns out to be Tanya's birthmark
The story's climax is at the school's depths	The story's climax is in the school basement
Harry and friends fight Voldemort's henchman	Tanya and friends fight Chuma-del-Tort
They win, but the Philosopher's Stone is purposefully destroyed.	They win, but the amulet is lost
Harry's first school year ends	Tanya's first school semester ends

== See also ==
- Parodies of Harry Potter
- Legal disputes over the Harry Potter series
- The Last Ringbearer – 1999 fantasy book by Russian author Kirill Yeskov
