= My Immortal (fan fiction) =

Harry Potter fan fiction of disputed authorship

- Author: Tara Gilesbie (identity disputed)
- Language: English
- Series: Harry Potter (non-canonical fan fiction)
- Genre: Fantasy, drama, romance, young adult fiction
- Publication date: 2006–2007
- Media type: Fan fiction

My Immortal is a Harry Potter-based fan fiction serially published on FanFiction.net between 2006 and 2007. The story centers on a non-canonical female vampire character named "Ebony Dark'ness Dementia Raven Way" and her relationships with the characters of the Harry Potter series, particularly her romantic relationship with Draco Malfoy, culminating in her traveling back in time to defeat the main antagonist of the series, Lord Voldemort. The work takes its name from the song "My Immortal" by Evanescence.

My Immortal is popularly regarded as one of the worst works of fan fiction ever written. Since the work's publication, it has gained infamy for its numerous grammar and spelling errors, plot inconsistencies, and complete disregard for the original Harry Potter source material. The story has been speculated to be a hoax designed to fool and troll readers or to satirize fan fiction, but others consider the work and the alleged online presence of the author too elaborate to fake effectively. Despite this, the series has also inspired multiple derivative works, including a YouTube web series, and is viewed by many with nostalgia for adolescent fan life.

The author's identity has never been confirmed. The author originally published the story under the username "XXXbloodyrists666XXX" and gave their name as "Tara Gilesbie". In September 2017, someone claiming to be the author updated a FictionPress account stating that she had created an active Tumblr account under her real name; an effort to locate this Tumblr account resulted in the account of young adult novelist Rose Christo. Christo stated that she was one of two co-authors of My Immortal and had provided evidence of her authorship to Macmillan Publishers, but controversy over factual errors in her then-forthcoming memoirs led to doubts as to her authorship.

== Plot ==
Unofficial fan art depicting Ebony Dark'ness Dementia Raven Way, the original character protagonist of the story

Ebony Dark'ness Dementia Raven Way, (Note: Ebony was partially renamed "Tara" Way during the fanfiction. Moreover, Ebony is frequently misspelled, most commonly as "Enoby") a seventeen-year-old vampire, attends Hogwarts (Note: Located in an Americanized interpretation of England instead of the original books' Scotland) as a student in the Slytherin House. Hogwarts is depicted as being divided between two cliques: Ebony and all the sympathetic characters are part of the "goffs" [sic], while the others, the "preps", are portrayed unsympathetically. Many of the main characters of Harry Potter are given extensive "goffik" [sic] makeovers and bear little similarity to their original characterization. (Note: Ebony and her classmates are seemingly depicted as attending Hogwarts in the mid-2000s instead of the 1990s, when the Harry Potter series is canonically set. There are repeated references to the scene and emo subcultures, which were experiencing a sharp rise in popularity at the time, such as references to My Chemical Romance (including the fact that Ebony's last surname is taken from its frontman Gerard Way), who did not form until 2001.) Harry, for example, has transfigured his lightning bolt scar into a pentagram, moved to the Slytherin House, and now goes by the name "Vampire" because he "love[s] the taste of human blood". Hermione Granger has changed her name to "B'loody Mary Smith" and lives as a goth vampire Satanist in Slytherin as well. Ron Weasley identifies as "Diabolo" [sic] and dates Willow, an insert for the author's friend Raven.

The story begins with Ebony entering a relationship with Draco Malfoy, who is depicted as shy, sensitive, and bisexual. Draco invites Ebony to a Good Charlotte concert in Hogsmeade. She agrees, partly because of her crush on Joel Madden, and the two fly to Hogsmeade together in Draco's black flying Mercedes-Benz. After the concert, they do not return to the castle, instead having sexual intercourse in the Forbidden Forest. They are discovered by Hogwarts' headmaster Albus Dumbledore, who yells at them and derides them as "motherfukers" [sic]. (Note: In a subsequent author's note, it is explained that this outburst occurred because Dumbledore was suffering from a headache.)

Later, Ebony confronts Vampire, as well as an entirely naked Draco, in front of Severus Snape's class. She learns that Draco used to date Vampire via a tattoo on Draco's arm. Ebony becomes so angry at this perceived betrayal (Note: Despite identifying as bisexual herself and professing a sexual attraction to "sensitive bi guyz") that she runs crying into the Forbidden Forest, where she is approached by Lord Voldemort. Voldemort, speaking in faux-archaic English, gives her a gun and demands that she kill Vampire. Voldemort threatens her, saying that he will kill Draco unless she kills Vampire, but she refuses. When Draco later learns of this encounter, he is so angry that Ebony kept it from him that he kills himself by slitting his wrists.

In a subsequent scene, however, Vampire has a vision of Draco being held prisoner by Voldemort. (Note: The discrepancy between this and the earlier depiction of Draco's suicide is not explained, though it is possibly an intentional plot twist, as prior setup suggests Draco could not have died in the manner described.) After rescuing Draco from Voldemort, Ebony and her friends attend a My Chemical Romance concert in Hogsmeade. The concert ends abruptly when the band members reveal themselves to be Voldemort and his "Death Dealers". Voldemort, who had been disguised as lead vocalist Gerard Way, proclaims his intent to kill Ebony and Draco for the former's failure to kill Vampire, but they are saved by Dumbledore, who had just given himself a gothic makeover. The next day, Dumbledore gives a gothic makeover to the Hogwarts Great Hall as well, but Ebony feels that he is a poseur and dislikes him greatly, a sentiment shared by her friends.

During this time, "Lucian Malfoy" and "Serious Blak" are inexplicably shot by a gun-toting "black guy". (Note: Possibly meant to be Blade, given the work's vampire themes) In addition, Hogwarts groundskeeper Hagrid is depicted as a teenage Hogwarts student and Satanist with a crush on Ebony, who is his bandmate in their gothic metal band Bloody Gothic Rose 666. Similarly changed in characterization, Professor Snape ("Snap", and sometimes "Snoop") and Professor Remus Lupin ("Loopin") are portrayed as perverts conspiring against Dumbledore. There is also a secondary plot point in which Professor Trelawney ("Trevolry") / Professor Sinistra ("Sinister"), combined into one character, has an addiction to a drug named Voldemortserum. (Note: Probably based on the truth serum Veritaserum used in the Harry Potter universe)

Ebony begins having mysterious visions, which she confronts "Professor Sinister" about. After gazing into a black crystal ball, she is told she must travel back in "tim" [sic] using a Pensieve to stop Tom Riddle from becoming Voldemort by seducing him and retrieve a cure for Sinister/Trevolry's addiction. Arriving in the past, Ebony meets the young Riddle, who calls himself "Satan" and is mistakenly referred to as "Tom Bombodil", "Tom Andorson", and "Stan". Satan is in a band with James Potter (father of Harry), Severus Snape, Sirius Black, and Lucius Malfoy. Satan is depicted attending Hogwarts at the same time as the Marauders in what is portrayed as the 1980s, despite his canonically having attended decades before the others. The author points out a few anachronisms in these scenes, telling readers to ignore them. There is also a cameo by a gothic Marty McFly, who gives Ebony a black DeLorean time machine able to transform into an iPod, allowing her to travel forward in time.

Eventually, Ebony brings Satan forward in time, where he morphs into the present-day Voldemort. This leads to a confrontation between the forces of good and evil in the Great Hall in which Professor Snape threatens to rape Draco if Ebony does not stab Vampire. The story ends abruptly and ambiguously with a shootout between Snape and Draco, Snape summoning Voldemort, and Ebony firing an Avada Kedavra curse, which is misspelled as "abra kedabra".

== Style and genre ==
My Immortal is split into 44 chapters with author's notes, indicated by "AN", preceding and throughout the narrative prose. These notes are written in a largely phonetic spelling and text speak, characterizing the author as "standoffish" (for example, one author's note says "dey nu eechodder b4" rather than "they knew each other before"). As the work progresses, these author's notes become increasingly "defensive, impenetrable, and prone to mentioning suicide attempts" and defend the work's poor spelling and deviation from canon.

Josephine Riesman of Vulture described the prose as having "awkward rhythm, strange digressions, and stultifyingly purple prose" and noted that the work is "agonizing" to a regular fan fiction reader because of "all the hated tropes" it employs in the opening passage alone. Adi Robertson of The Verge observed that the quality of the prose declined after the twelfth chapter, when the work's editor had a falling out with the author and became temporarily uninvolved with the work; even after the editor and author reconciled, Robertson felt that the prose "never recovered". Gavia Baker-Whitelaw of The Daily Dot noted the work "featured all the hallmarks of terrible fanfic: hundreds of grammar and spelling mistakes, a nonsensical storyline, and a Mary Sue protagonist who was clearly a glorified version of the author" and pointed out the numerous descriptions of the protagonist's Hot Topic outfits.

The work is characterized by misspellings permeating both the work itself and the author's notes to the point that the names of the protagonist and canonical Harry Potter characters are frequently and variously misspelled. A 2011 analysis of the text found that it contains far more spelling mistakes (approximately 5,200) than grammar errors (nearly 700). Although the work does contain many grammar errors, the majority of the sentences are technically well-formed and fairly complex in structure; "This contrast between [the author]'s grammatical talent and lexical disability makes the reader aware that the author is capable of writing well, but unwilling to do so." The spelling mistakes also include "provocative" malapropisms, replacing common words with unrelated and improbably rare vocabulary. For example:

I have to tell you the fucking perdition.

— Chapter 27, My Immortal (2006)

Perdition, here replacing the word prediction, refers to eternal damnation of the soul in Christian theology. This fits in with the story's gothic and sadist themes.

Among the misspellings in the work, the gothic subculture and aesthetic is spelled "goffik", whose adherents, including the protagonist, are known as "goffs". Such spellings denote the pronunciation of English "th" as "f", which is known as th-fronting. Either intentionally or by coincidence, such pronunciation is coherent for a story set in a boarding school in England, where English dialects such as Cockney, Manchester, Essex and Multicultural London English feature it.

The work notably fails to adhere to Harry Potter canon. It features "an incredibly out-of-character Harry Potter universe" where "at no point do any of the Harry Potter characters act even slightly like themselves". References to "decidedly un-Harry Potterish bands" such as My Chemical Romance, and references to book-only characters from Lord of the Rings, have also been noted.

Chapters 39 and 40, according to the author's notes, were written by a hacker; the writing in both chapters was a "much more controlled prose that read like a lampoon of the previous 38".

Due to its "systematically terrible" quality, the work is often believed to be a satire or parody of fan fiction. At the same time, the "exceedingly complicated" details of the work, including a series of related online accounts outside of FanFiction.net and the effort of writing a work of such length, led to a "consensus" among users of Encyclopedia Dramatica — a website dedicated to cataloging "internet culture" — that it would be too difficult to fake and that Gilesbie was writing sincerely, a sentiment apparently shared by other online communities who mocked the author. Brad Kim, editor of Know Your Meme, supported the work as genuine, citing his experiences with writing workshops on LiveJournal and Xanga where he encountered similar works, as "these were the kinds of things that would be formulated by a high school teenager in the early 2000s".

== Authorship ==
The true identity of My Immortal's author has become subject to wide speculation, and since the publication of the final chapter, various individuals have claimed to have written the work in jest or as a hoax.

My Immortal was published on FanFiction.net under the username "XXXbloodyrists666XXX", with the author using the name "Tara Gilesbie" throughout the work. Author's notes in the story identified a friend nicknamed Raven, operating under username "bloodytearz666", as the work's editor and beta reader. The work was published between early 2006 and 2007, ultimately totaling 44 chapters and nearly 22,700 words. The forty-fourth chapter was accompanied by an author's note explaining that the author was leaving "dubya [sic]", commonly believed to be Dubai or a place beginning with a W, and the chapter would be the last until the author's return. However, no further chapters were published. It was removed from the site in 2008, a few months after its last chapter was published. The complete text survives in copied-and-pasted versions across the Internet.

In 2008 and 2009, a series of videos were uploaded to a YouTube account named "xXblo0dyxkissxX" in which two teenagers calling themselves Tara and Raven made fun of goth subculture. The overlap with the culture and style of My Immortal have led to speculation that they were the fan fiction's Tara and Raven. They were found and interviewed for a 2014 On the Media blog and claimed they were not the authors and that their real names were Sarah (Raven) and Rachel (Tara), with Rachel claiming she did not know about My Immortal until after uploading the videos. They state that in their videos they were making fun of their goth phase and that they chose their pseudonyms at random.

=== Rose Christo co-authorship claim ===
Rose Christo, an author of young adult novels, began writing a memoir about her alleged experiences as a Native American child separated from her brother in the New York foster care system. The memoir, entitled Under the Same Stars: The Search for My Brother and the True Story of My Immortal, details the period of time during which she allegedly co-wrote My Immortal. Macmillan Publishers allegedly hired a lawyer to verify Christo's claims over the course of three days; she claimed to have provided proof through the email address with which she created the FanFiction.net account and with a flash drive containing the first eleven unedited chapters of My Immortal.

In March 2017, Christo quietly stated on her Tumblr account that she co-wrote My Immortal; however, the post gained little notice. In early August 2017, Christo posted an update to a previously unknown FictionPress account, seemingly related to Tara Gilesbie, that similarly received little attention.

Later in August, an independently published novel titled Handbook for Mortals came to public attention after it was discovered that its sales were artificially inflated to push it to the top of the young adult New York Times Best Seller list, from which it was subsequently removed. Writing similarities between the novel and My Immortal led to speculation that Handbook for Mortals author Lani Sarem was the author of My Immortal. Christo again updated the FictionPress account to say she was not Sarem. She also posted on FictionPress to state that her only social media account was on Tumblr, which operated under her real name. An editorial assistant at Macmillan Publishers also stated that Sarem was not the author of My Immortal and stated that Macmillan was to publish the author's memoir.

These statements sparked a search for the claimed Tumblr account, which was found as Christo's in early September. By September 5, Christo stated on her Tumblr account that she co-wrote My Immortal and that she had provided proof to her publisher Macmillan Publishers, later reported by BuzzFeed, and on September 7, BuzzFeed published her first official statement as the alleged author of My Immortal. She said of her decision to publicly identify herself as a co-author: "I would never have come forward about My Immortal if not for the fact that it coincided with the things that happened to me as a teen."

In October, Christo admitted that she had falsified some of the information put forward, which she said was to protect her family's identities, and that her book would not be published. Macmillan Publishers soon confirmed this, stating only: "Wednesday Books has cancelled publication of Under the Same Stars. We have no further comment."

== Reception and legacy ==
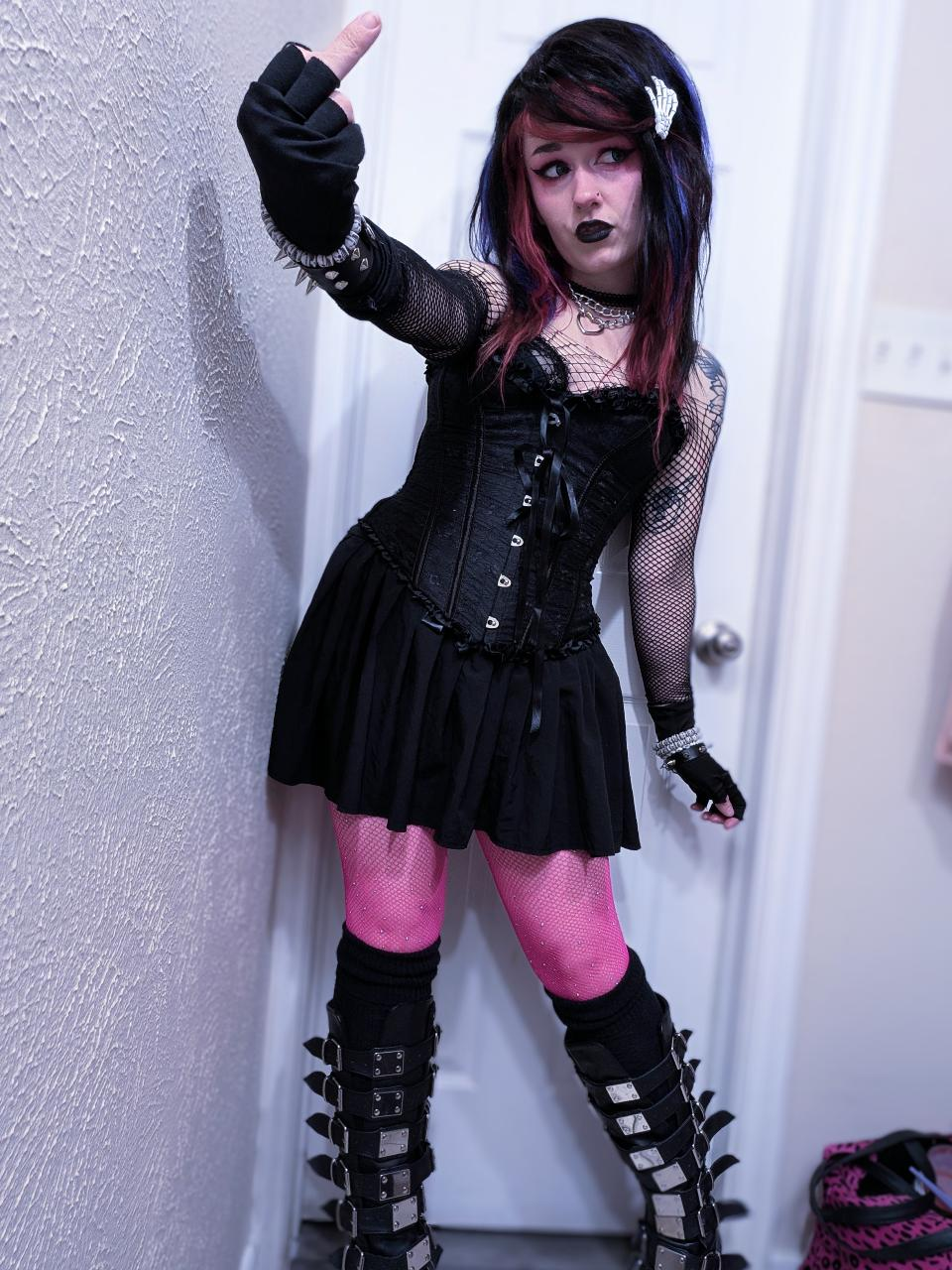
Cosplay of Ebony, the main character

Before its removal from FanFiction.Net, My Immortal reportedly gained between 8,000 and 10,000 reviews, most of which were negative and contained flaming. The quality of the writing and the author's apparent goth lifestyle also drew attacks and mockery from users on Encyclopedia Dramatica, TV Tropes, LiveJournal, Something Awful, YTMND and YouTube.

Rob Bricken of io9 described the work as a "masterpiece of weirdness" and a "masterpiece of literary disaster". BuzzFeed called it a "work of comic genius" that is "oddly touching." It is often cited as the worst fan fiction ever written or a "strong contender" for the title. The work is considered "iconic" within the Harry Potter fandom and within the larger fan fiction community. The Verge asked Evanescence singer Amy Lee about the fan fiction, whose title is believed to be inspired by the Evanescence song "My Immortal". Lee said her sister brought it to her attention but she avoided reading it until The Verge requested the interview. Lee expressed confusion about the work's earnestness and found it comical "because of the nonsense". Michael J. Nelson and Conor Lastowka read the story on their podcast 372 Pages We'll Never Get Back in episodes 78–80, criticizing its bad writing and messy plot.

Scott Alexander argued that the work can serve as a projective test. He provided an example with a tongue-in-cheek argument that it mirrors the typical structures and tropes that medieval alchemists used to encipher their results.

The infamy of the work is considered a "constant millstone around the necks of fanfiction enthusiasts who struggle to bring legitimacy to the genre". Christo claimed in September 2017 that My Immortal is a work of satire, though any evidence of this is tied to her own claims of authorship.

My Immortal inspired further fan works, including fan art and further fan fiction. It was the subject of numerous YouTube dramatic readings intending to mock the work; it later inspired a fifteen-episode web series satirizing the work.

== See also ==
- All the Young Dudes
- Harry Potter and the Methods of Rationality
- Harry Potter in Calcutta
- Hogwarts School of Prayer and Miracles
- List of fake memoirs and journals
- Poe's law, an online adage stating that it is difficult to distinguish authentic works from satire
- The Eye of Argon, a 1970 published novella with a similar reputation
