= BookBrunch =

British website and digital newsletter

BookBrunch is a British subscription-based website and digital newsletter for the international publishing industry. It is jointly edited by Nicholas Clee and Neill Denny, both former editors of The Bookseller. Nicholas Clee is a former judge of the Booker Prize and author. Neill Denny was previously editor of Retail Week.

As well as a daily news email, BookBrunch produces print Show Dailies for both the London Book Fair and the Frankfurt Book Fair in partnership with Publishers Weekly, the American weekly book trade news magazine, as well as a magazine to accompany the Sharjah International Book Fair.

== History ==
Nicholas Clee and Liz Thomson, former editor of the now defunct trade paper Publishing News (1979–2008), set up BookBrunch in 2008 with private backing. Bibliographic Data Services (BDS), a data provision and web hosting company, bought a majority share in the service in 2011, when Eric Green, Managing Director of Digital at BDS, became BookBrunch's CEO. Liz Thomson left BookBrunch in 2015, with Neill Denny joining in January 2016.

== Present day ==
In addition to the joint editors, Lucy Nathan and Julie Vuong provide editorial support and interviews, and there is a roster of regular contributors, including Roger Tagholm (a round-up of international book industry news), Alastair Horne (academic and STM news), and Nicolette Jones (children's news). Jo Henry, formerly managing director of Book Marketing Limited (BML) and Publishing News and Research Director at Nielsen BookScan, has been Managing Director since April 2018, and David Roche, previously of HarperCollins, Waterstones and Borders, is non-executive Chair. BookBrunch's daily morning news email covers developments across publishers and booksellers, including acquisition deals by publishers, company results, job changes, literary awards, festivals, plus columnists and profiles of industry personnel. BookBrunch has a media partnership with the London Book Fair (LBF) to support LBF's Trailblazer Awards, created to celebrate the next generation of the UK publishing industry.

In November 2018 BookBrunch, in partnership with the London Book Fair and Nielsen BookScan, launched the Selfies book awards, a prize for the best self-published author in the UK sponsored by IngramSpark, a division of the Ingram Content Group. For 2021 there are three categories of books being judged, adult fiction, children's books and autobiography/memoir.
