= J. K. Rowling =

British author (born 1965)

J. K. Rowling CH OBE FRSL FRCPE
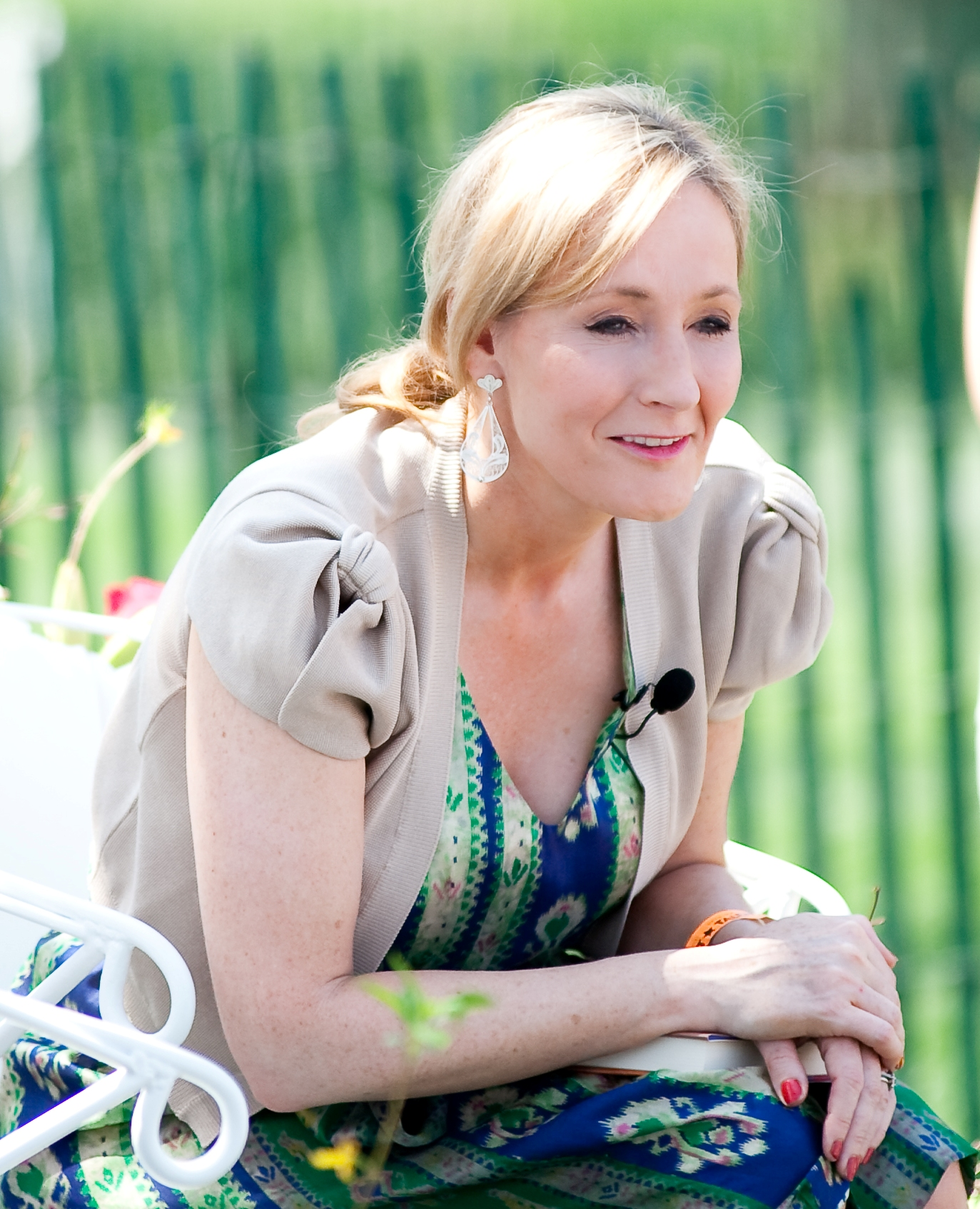
- Rowling at the White House in 2010
- Born: Joanne Rowling; 31 July 1965 (age 61); Yate, Gloucestershire, England
- Education: University of Exeter (BA); Moray House (Note: Moray House was then part of Heriot-Watt University and later became part of the University of Edinburgh.)
- Occupations: Author; philanthropist; producer; screenwriter
- Spouses: Jorge Arantes (m. 1992; div. 1995); Neil Murray (m. 2001)
- Children: 3
- Writing career
- Pen name: J. K. Rowling; Robert Galbraith
- Years active: 1997–present
- Period: Contemporary
- Genres: Fantasy; drama; young adult fiction; crime fiction
- Notable awards: Full list
- Website: jkrowling.com

Joanne Rowling (/ˈroʊlɪŋ/ ROH-ling; born 31 July 1965), better known by her pen name J. K. Rowling, is a British author, philanthropist, producer and screenwriter. She is best known for writing Harry Potter, a seven-volume fantasy series about a young wizard and the best-selling book series in history, with over 600 million copies sold. She also writes Cormoran Strike, an ongoing crime fiction series, under the alias Robert Galbraith.

Rowling conceived the idea for the Harry Potter series in 1990. The seven-year period that followed saw the death of her mother, the birth of her first child, divorce from her first husband, and relative poverty until the first novel in the series, Harry Potter and the Philosopher's Stone, was published in 1997. Six sequels followed, concluding with Harry Potter and the Deathly Hallows (2007). In 2008 Forbes named her the world's highest-paid author. The books have been translated into 85 languages and have spawned a global media franchise including films and video games. The series revived fantasy as a genre in the children's market, spawned a host of imitators, and inspired an active fandom. Critical reception has been more mixed. Many reviewers see Rowling's writing as conventional; some regard her portrayal of gender and social division as regressive. There were also religious debates over the Harry Potter series.

Rowling has won many accolades for her work. She was named to the Order of the British Empire and was appointed a member of the Order of the Companions of Honour for services to literature and philanthropy. Harry Potter brought her wealth and recognition, which she has used to advance philanthropic endeavours and political causes. She established the Volant Charitable Trust in 2000, and co-founded the charity Lumos in 2005. Rowling's philanthropy has centred on medical causes and supporting at-risk women and children. Forbes has estimated that Rowling's total charitable giving between 2005 and 2025 exceeded US$250 million. She has also donated to the Labour Party, and opposed Scottish independence and Brexit.

Rowling has attracted criticism for transgender-exclusionary positions she has taken from 2019 onwards, including opposition to gender self-identification and to allowing transgender women into women's toilets and changing rooms. She has supported and donated to the campaign group For Women Scotland, the plaintiffs in For Women Scotland Ltd v The Scottish Ministers.

== Name ==
Although she writes under the pen name J. K. Rowling, her birth name was Joanne Rowling with no middle name, nicknamed Jo. Staff at Bloomsbury Publishing suggested that she use two initials rather than her full name, as they believed young boys – their target audience – would not want to read a book written by a woman. She chose K as the second initial, from her paternal grandmother Kathleen Rowling, and because of the ease of pronunciation of the two consecutive letters. Following her 2001 remarriage, she has sometimes used the name Joanne Murray when conducting personal business.

== Life and career ==
=== Early life and family ===
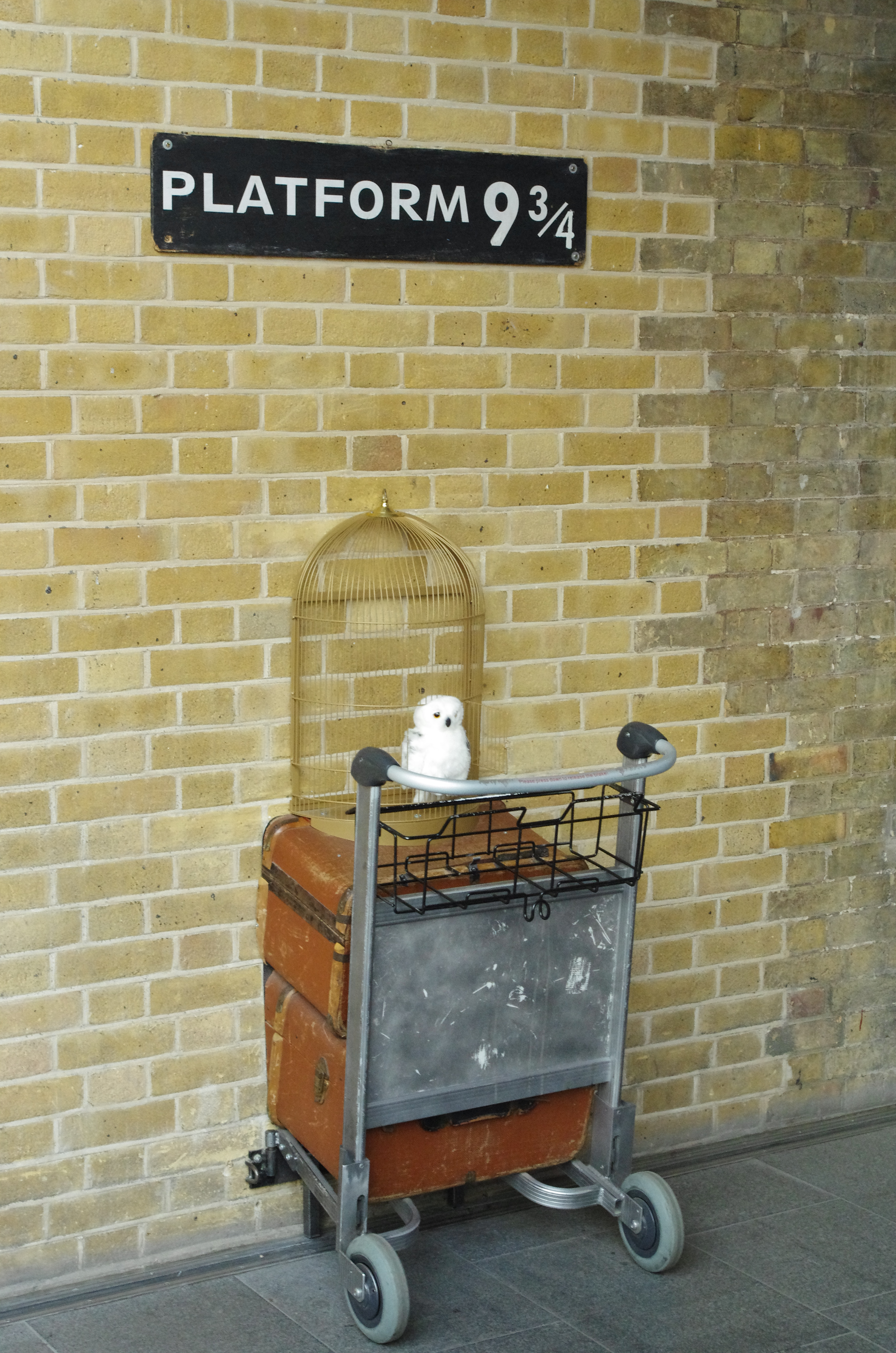
Rowling's parents met on a train from King's Cross; her portal to the magical world is "Platform 9 3/4" at King's Cross.

Joanne Rowling was born on 31 July 1965 in Yate, Gloucestershire, (Note: Sources differ on the precise name of Rowling's place of birth. As of July 2024, Rowling's personal website said she was born at "Yate General Hospital near Bristol". She has sometimes said she was born in Chipping Sodbury, which is near Yate. Tison Pugh says she was born in Chipping Sodbury General Hospital. The Scotsman lists Cottage Hospital in Chipping Sodbury. Biographer Smith describes Chipping Sodbury as "Yate's elegant neighbor", and reproduces a birth certificate that says District Sodbury, but lists the hospital as Cottage Hospital, 240 Station Road, Yate. According to Smith: "... the [BBC Television] documentary still erroneously claimed that Joanne was born in Chipping Sodbury. Yet despite the mistake, the good folk of Yate are pressing for some kind of plaque or feature in their town to record it as her place of birth.") to a middle-class family. Her parents Anne (née Volant) and Peter ("Pete") James Rowling had met the previous year on a train, sharing a trip from King's Cross station, London, to their naval postings at Arbroath, Scotland. Rowling's mother was with the Wrens and her father with the Royal Navy. Her mother was of Scottish and French ancestry. Pete Rowling was the son of a machine-tool setter who later opened a grocery shop. Pete and Anne married on 14 March 1965 and settled in Yate, where Pete started work as an assembly-line production worker and eventually worked his way into management as a chartered engineer. Anne Rowling later worked as a science technician. Neither of Rowling's parents attended university. Rowling is two years older than her sister, Dianne.

When she was four, Rowling's family moved to Winterbourne, Gloucestershire. She began at St Michael's Church of England Primary School in Winterbourne when she was five. (Note: St Michael's Primary School headmaster, Alfred Dunn, has been suggested as the inspiration for the Harry Potter headmaster Albus Dumbledore; biographer Smith writes that Rowling's father, and other figures in her education, provide more likely examples.) The Rowlings lived near a family called Potter – a name Rowling always liked. (Note: Rowling denies that her young playmate Ian Potter represents Harry.) Rowling's mother liked to read and the family's homes were filled with books. Her father read The Wind in the Willows to his daughters, while her mother introduced them to the animals in Richard Scarry's books. Rowling's first attempt at writing, a story called "Rabbit" composed when she was six, was inspired by Scarry's creatures.

When Rowling was about nine, the family purchased the historic Church Cottage in Tutshill. (Note: Smith describes Tutshill as "staunchly middle class", and Parker describes Church Cottage as a "handsome Gothic Revival cottage". In 2020, it was reported that a company listing Rowling's husband, Neil Murray, as director had purchased Church Cottage and renovations were underway.) In 1974, Rowling began attending the nearby Church of England School. Biographer Sean Smith describes her teacher as a "battleaxe" who "struck fear into the hearts of the children"; Rowling's teacher seated her in "dunces' row" after she performed poorly on an arithmetic test. (Note: Pugh writes that "Rowling reportedly modeled the strict pedagogical style of Severus Snape after [Sylvia] Morgan's methods." Kirk states that "Jo has admitted modeling Professor Snape on a few of her most memorable and least favorite people from her past, and she has said that Mrs. Morgan ... was definitely one of them." According to Smith, "Aspects of Mrs Morgan's fearsome character are embodied in the Hogwarts' Potions master, Professor Severus Snape.") In 1975, Rowling joined a Brownies pack. Its special events and parties, and the pack groups (Fairies, Pixies, Sprites, Elves, Gnomes and Imps) provided a magical world away from her stern teacher. When she was eleven or twelve, she wrote a short story, "The Seven Cursed Diamonds". She later described herself during this period as "the epitome of a bookish child – short and squat, thick National Health glasses, living in a world of complete daydreams".

=== Secondary school and university ===
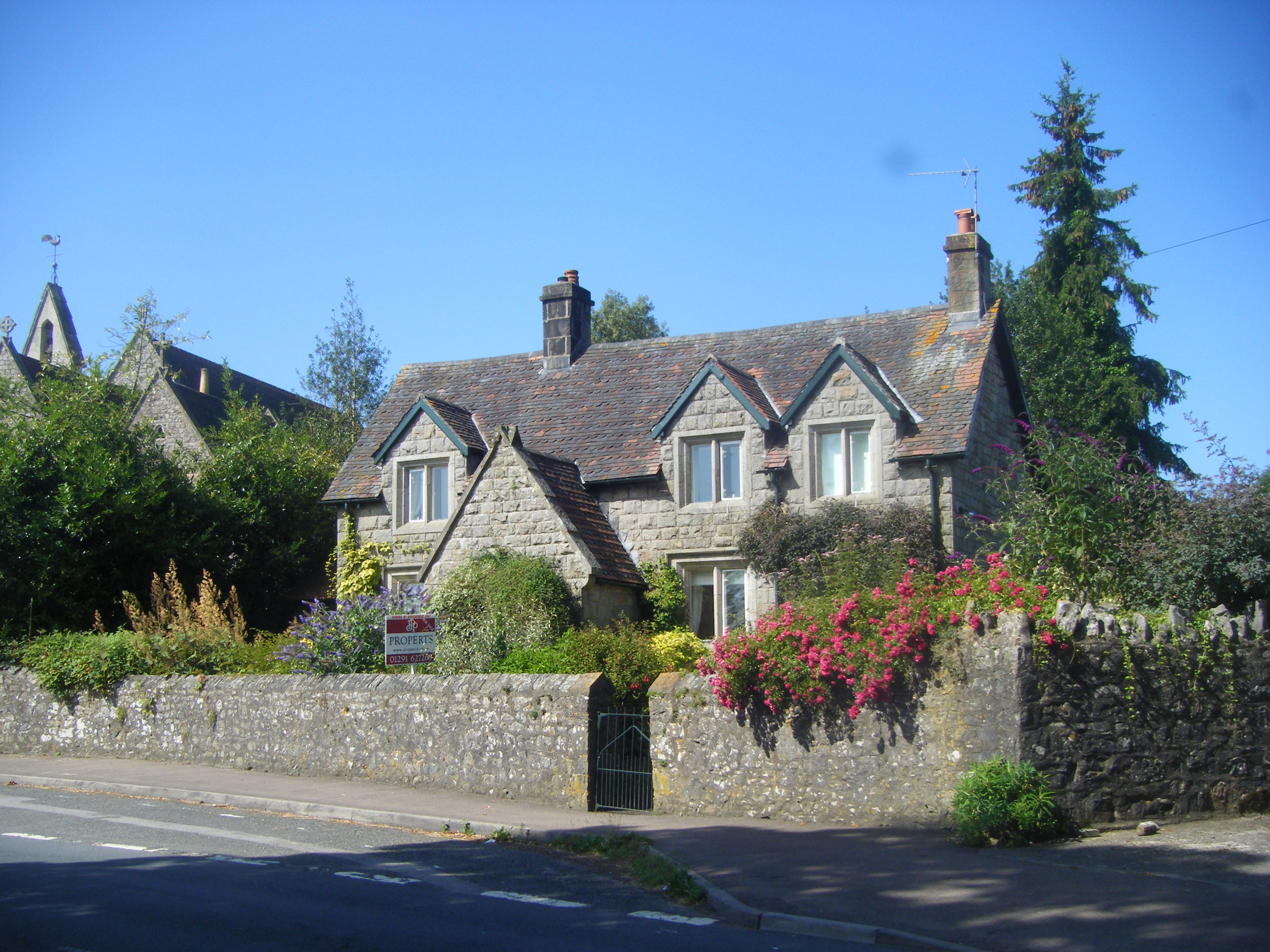
Church Cottage, Tutshill, Gloucestershire, Rowling's childhood home

Rowling's secondary school was Wyedean School and College, a state school she began attending at the age of eleven and where she was bullied. Rowling was inspired by her favourite teacher, Lucy Shepherd, who taught the importance of structure and precision in writing. Smith describes her as "intelligent yet shy". Her teacher Dale Neuschwander was impressed by her imagination. When she was a young teenager, Rowling's great-aunt gave her Hons and Rebels, the autobiography of the civil rights activist Jessica Mitford, who became Rowling's heroine.

Anne had a strong influence on her daughter. Early in Rowling's life, the support of her mother and sister instilled confidence and enthusiasm for storytelling. Anne was a creative and accomplished cook, (Note: Smith compares the place meals held in the Rowling household and the descriptions of food in The Little White Horse to the elaborate food prepared for Hogwarts pupils.) who helped lead her daughters' Brownie activities, and took a job in the chemistry department at Wyedean while her daughters were there. John Nettleship, the head of science at Wyedean, described Anne as "absolutely brilliant ... very imaginative". Anne was diagnosed with a "virulent strain" of multiple sclerosis when she was 34 or 35 and Jo was 15. Rowling's home life was complicated by her mother's illness and a strained relationship with her father. Rowling later said "home was a difficult place to be", and that her teenage years were unhappy. In 2020, she wrote that her father would have preferred a son and described herself as having severe obsessive–compulsive disorder in her teens. She began to smoke, took an interest in alternative rock, and adopted Siouxsie Sioux's back-combed hair and black eyeliner. Sean Harris, her best friend in the Upper Sixth, owned a turquoise Ford Anglia that provided an escape from her difficult home life and the means for Harris and Rowling to broaden their activities. (Note: Rowling later described Harris as her "getaway driver and foul weather friend"; his Anglia inspired a flying version that appeared in Harry Potter and the Chamber of Secrets as a symbol of escape and rescue.)

Living in a small town with pressures at home, Rowling became more interested in her schoolwork. Steve Eddy, her first secondary school English teacher, remembers her as "not exceptional" but "quite good at English". Rowling took A-levels in English, French, and German, achieving two As and a B, and was named head girl at Wyedean. She applied to Oxford University in 1982 but was rejected. Biographers attribute her rejection to lack of privilege, as she had attended a state school rather than a private one.

Rowling always wanted to be a writer, but chose to study French and the classics at the University of Exeter for practical reasons, influenced by her parents who thought job prospects would be better with evidence of bilingualism. She later stated that Exeter was not initially what she expected ("to be among lots of similar people – thinking radical thoughts") but that she enjoyed herself after she met more people like her. She was an average student at Exeter, described by biographers as prioritising her social life over her studies, and lacking ambition and enthusiasm. Rowling recalls doing little work at university, preferring to read Charles Dickens and J. R. R. Tolkien. She earned a BA in French from Exeter, graduating in 1987 after a year of study in Paris.

=== Inspiration and mother's death ===
After university, Rowling moved to a flat in Clapham Junction with friends, and took a course to become a bilingual secretary. While she was working in temporary jobs in London, Amnesty International hired her to document human rights issues in French-speaking Africa. She began writing adult novels while working as a temp, although they were never published. In 1990, she planned to move with her boyfriend to Manchester, and frequently took long train trips to visit. In mid-1990, she was on a train delayed by four hours from Manchester to London, when the characters Harry Potter, Ron Weasley, and Hermione Granger came plainly into her mind. Having no pen or paper allowed her to fully explore the characters and their story in her imagination before she reached her flat and began to write.

Rowling moved to Manchester around November 1990. She described her time in Manchester, where she worked for the Chamber of Commerce and at Manchester University in temp jobs, as a "year of misery". Her mother died of multiple sclerosis on 30 December 1990. At the time, Rowling was writing Harry Potter, and her mother's death heavily affected her writing.

The pain of the loss of her mother was compounded when some personal effects her mother had left her were stolen. With the end of the relationship with her boyfriend, and "being made redundant from an office job in Manchester", Rowling moved to Porto, Portugal, in November 1991 to teach night classes in English as a foreign language, writing during the day.

=== Marriage, divorce and single parenthood ===
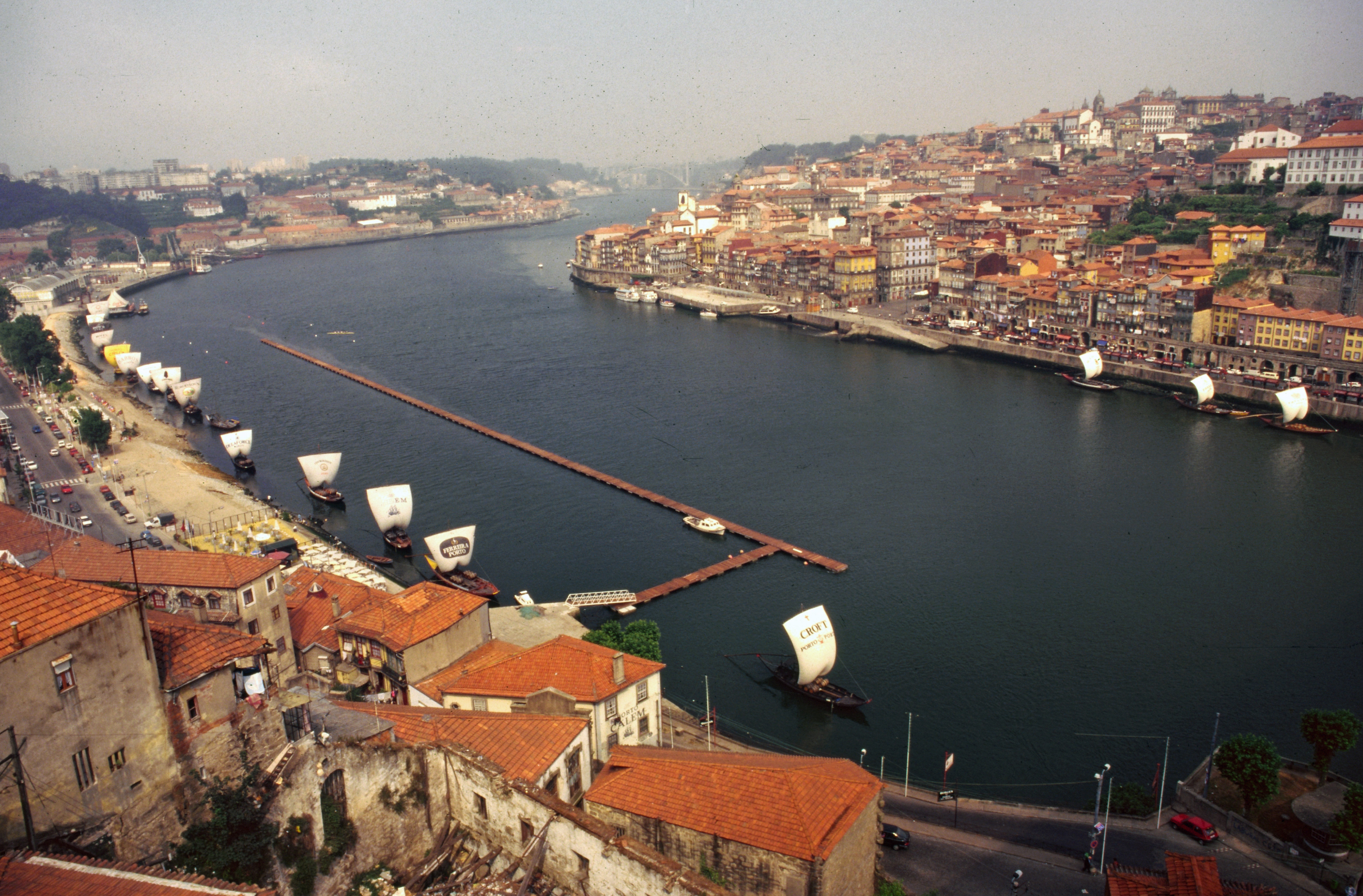
Rowling moved to Porto, Portugal, to teach English.

Five months after arriving in Porto, Rowling met the Portuguese television journalist Jorge Arantes in a bar and found that they shared an interest in Jane Austen. The relationship was troubled, but they married on 16 October 1992. (Note: Pugh writes, "In a droll allusion to this ill-fated union, Professor Trelawney warns Lavender Brown, 'Incidentally, that thing you are dreading – it will happen on Friday the sixteenth of October'.") Their daughter Jessica Isabel Rowling Arantes (named after Jessica Mitford (Note: Rowling says that Jessica was named after Mitford and a boy would have been named Harry; according to Smith (2002), Arantes says that Jessica was named after Jezebel from the Bible.)) was born on 27 July 1993 in Portugal. By this time, Rowling had finished the first three chapters of Harry Potter and the Philosopher's Stone – almost as they were eventually published – and had drafted the rest of the novel.

Rowling experienced domestic abuse during her marriage. Arantes said in June 2020 that he had slapped her and did not regret it. Rowling described the marriage as "short and catastrophic". She says she was not allowed to have a house key and that her husband used the growing manuscript of her first book as a hostage. Rowling and Arantes separated on 17 November 1993 after Arantes threw her out of the house; she returned with the police to retrieve Jessica and her belongings and went into hiding for two weeks before she left Portugal. In late 1993, with a draft of Harry Potter in her suitcase, Rowling moved with her daughter to Edinburgh, Scotland, planning to stay with her sister until Christmas. Her biographer Sean Smith raises the question of why Rowling did not stay with her father. Rowling has spoken of an estrangement from her father; he had married his secretary within two years of her mother's death, and The Scotsman reported that this caused a rift between his daughters and their father.

Rowling sought government assistance and got £69 per week from Social Security; not wanting to burden her recently married sister, she moved to a flat that she described as mouse-ridden. She later described her economic status as being as "poor as it is possible to be in modern Britain, without being homeless". Seven years after graduating from university, she saw herself as a failure. Tison Pugh writes that the "grinding effects of poverty, coupled with her concern for providing for her daughter as a single parent, caused great hardship". Her marriage had failed, and she was jobless with a dependent child, but she later described this as "liberating" her to focus on writing. She has said that "Jessica kept me going". Her old school friend, Sean Harris, lent her £600 ($900), which allowed her to move to a flat in Leith, where she finished Philosopher's Stone.

Arantes arrived in Scotland in March 1994 seeking both Rowling and Jessica. On 15 March 1994, Rowling sought an action of interdict (order of restraint); the interdict was granted and Arantes returned to Portugal. Early in the year, Rowling began to experience a deep depression and sought medical help when she contemplated suicide. (Note: The depression inspired the Dementors – soul-sucking creatures introduced in Harry Potter and the Prisoner of Azkaban.) With nine months of therapy, her mental health gradually improved. She filed for divorce on 10 August 1994; the divorce was finalised on 26 June 1995.

Rowling wanted to finish the book before enrolling on a teacher training course, fearing she might not be able to finish once she started the course. She often wrote in cafés, including Nicolson's, part-owned by her brother-in-law. Secretarial work brought in £15 ($22.50) per week, but she would lose government benefits if she earned more. In mid-1995, a friend gave her money that allowed her to come off benefits and enrol full-time in college. Still needing money and expecting to make a living by teaching, Rowling began a teacher training course in August 1995 at Moray House School of Education after completing her first novel. She earned her teaching certificate in July 1996 and began teaching at Leith Academy.

=== Publishing Harry Potter ===
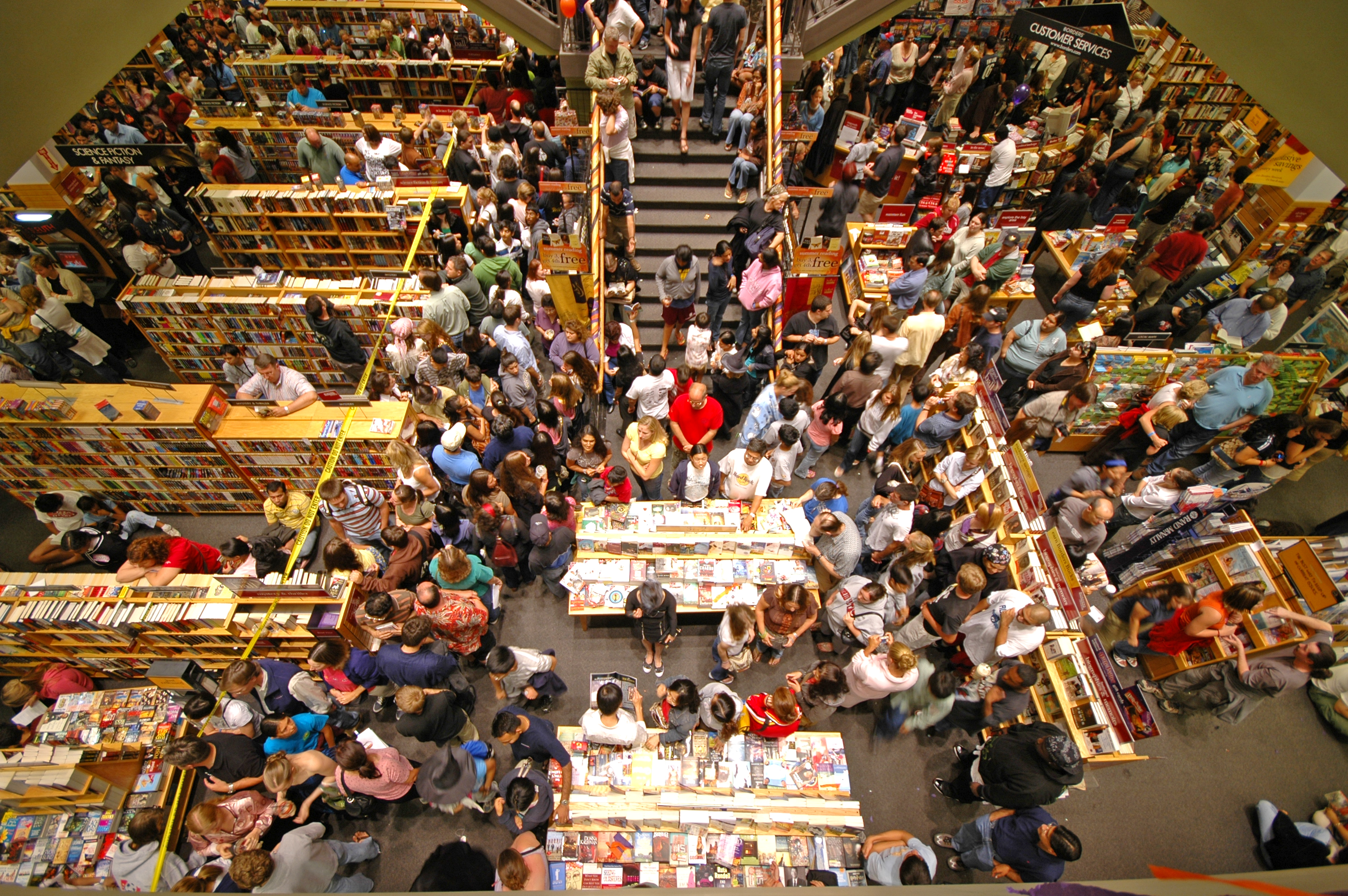
A bookshop in California, US, in 2007, five minutes before Harry Potter and the Deathly Hallows was released

Rowling completed Harry Potter and the Philosopher's Stone in June 1995. The initial draft included an illustration of Harry by a fireplace, showing a lightning-shaped scar on his forehead. Following an enthusiastic report from an early reader, Christopher Little Literary Agency agreed to represent Rowling. Her manuscript was submitted to twelve publishers, all of which rejected it. Barry Cunningham, who ran the children's literature department at Bloomsbury Publishing, bought it after Nigel Newton, who headed Bloomsbury at the time, saw his eight-year-old daughter finish one chapter and want to keep reading. Rowling recalls Cunningham telling her, "You'll never make any money out of children's books, Jo." Rowling was awarded a writer's grant by the Scottish Arts Council (Note: The Scottish Arts Council grant was after Rowling had a contract for publication of Philosopher's Stone but before it was published.) to support her childcare costs and finances before Philosopher's Stone's publication, and to aid in writing the sequel, Chamber of Secrets. On 26 June 1997, Bloomsbury published Philosopher's Stone with an initial print run of 5,650 copies. (Note: According to Errington, 500 hardbacks and 5,150 paperbacks "were published on the same date and neither has bibliographical priority". It was previously believed that the initial print run was 500 copies total, but this number is "woefully inaccurate".) Before Chamber of Secrets was published, Rowling had received £2,800 ($4,200) in royalties.

Philosopher's Stone introduces Harry Potter. Harry is a wizard who lives with his non-magical relatives until his eleventh birthday, when he is invited to attend Hogwarts School of Witchcraft and Wizardry. Rowling wrote six sequels, which follow Harry's adventures at Hogwarts with friends Hermione Granger and Ron Weasley and his attempts to defeat the wizard, Lord Voldemort, who killed Harry's parents when he was a child.

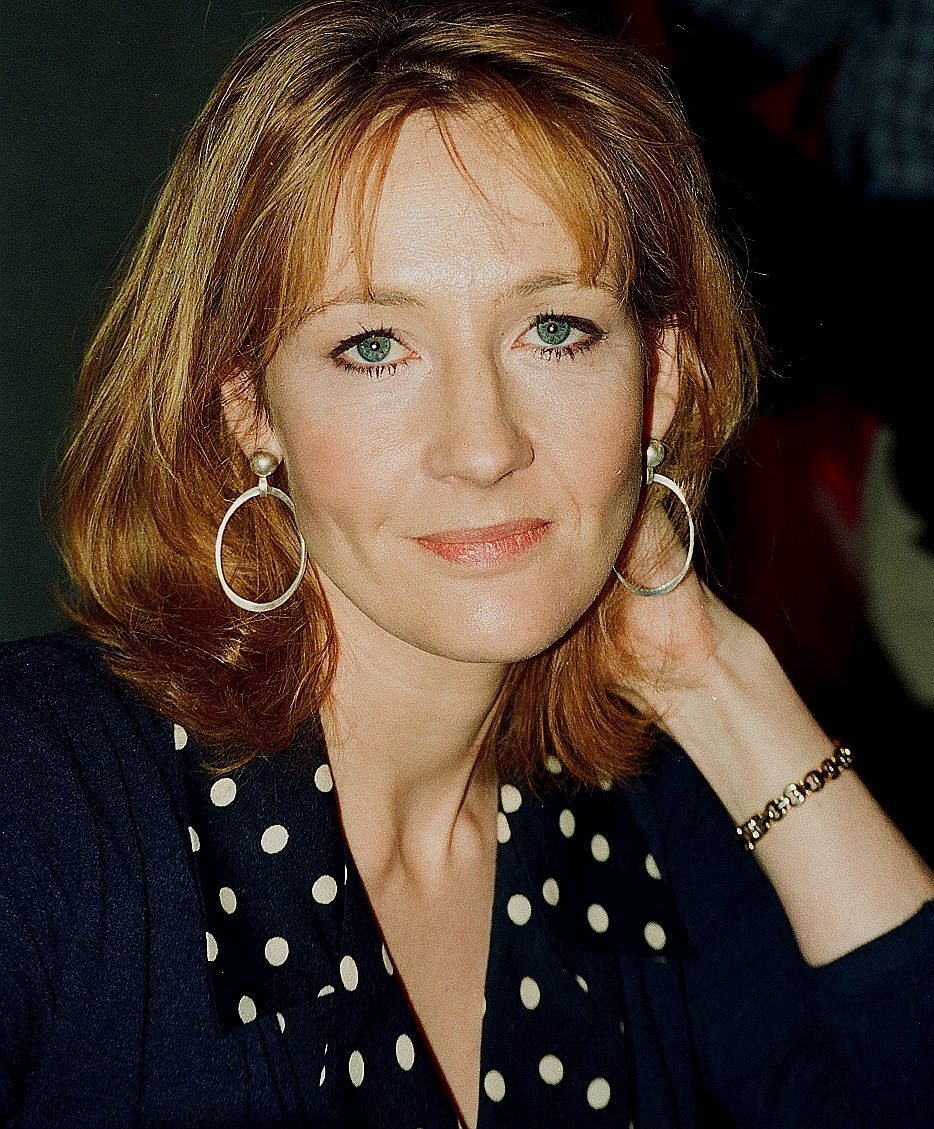
Rowling at the National Press Club in Washington, D.C. in 1999

Rowling received the news that the US rights were being auctioned at the Bologna Children's Book Fair. To her surprise and delight, Scholastic Corporation bought the rights for $105,000. She bought a flat in Edinburgh with the money from the sale. Arthur A. Levine, head of the imprint at Scholastic, pushed for a name change. He wanted Harry Potter and the School of Magic; as a compromise Rowling suggested Harry Potter and the Sorcerer's Stone. Sorcerer's Stone was released in the United States in September 1998. It was not widely reviewed, but the reviews it received were generally positive. Sorcerer's Stone became a New York Times bestseller by December.

The next three books in the series were released in quick succession between 1998 and 2000, each selling millions of copies. Due to the delay of Harry Potter and the Order of the Phoenix in 2002, rumours circulated that Rowling had writer's block. Rowling denied these rumours, stating the 896-page book took three years to write because of its length. It was published in June 2003, selling millions of copies on the first day. Harry Potter and the Half-Blood Prince was released two years later in July 2005, again selling millions of copies on the first day. The series ended with Harry Potter and the Deathly Hallows, published in July 2007.

Rowling launched Pottermore in 2011 which served as the publisher for Harry Potter e-books and audiobooks (which Rowling had reserved the sole rights to). Until 2015, sales could only be fulfilled through Pottermore, bypassing other marketing formats. In 2015 the site moved to a more traditional content model, and Rowling allowed digital sales to transition to an industry standard open-commerce model.

=== Films ===
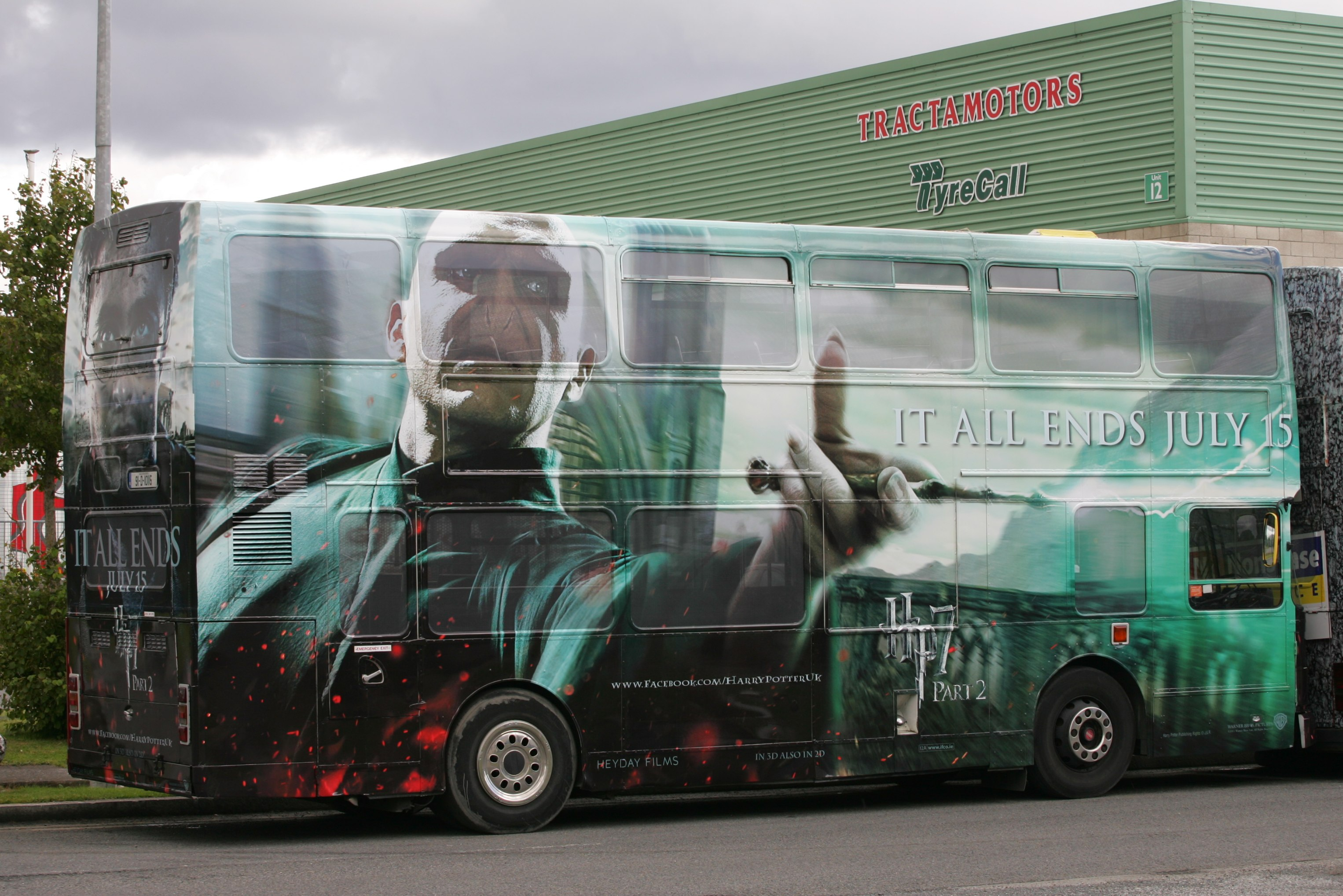
Bus promoting Deathly Hallows – Part 2, 2011

In 1999, Warner Bros. purchased film rights to the first two Harry Potter novels for a reported $1 million. Rowling accepted the offer with the provision that the studio only produce Harry Potter films based on books she authored, while retaining the right to final script approval, and some control over merchandising. Harry Potter and the Philosopher's Stone, an adaptation of the first Harry Potter book, was released in November 2001. Steve Kloves wrote the screenplays for all but the fifth film, with Rowling's assistance, ensuring that his scripts kept to the plots of the novels. The film series concluded with Harry Potter and the Deathly Hallows, which was adapted in two parts; part one was released on 19 November 2010, and part two followed on 15 July 2011.

Warner Bros. announced an expanded relationship with Rowling in 2013, including a planned series of films about her character Newt Scamander, fictitious author of Fantastic Beasts and Where to Find Them. The first film of five, a prequel to the Harry Potter series, set roughly 70 years earlier, was released in November 2016. Rowling wrote the screenplay, which was released as a book. Crimes of Grindelwald was released in November 2018. Secrets of Dumbledore was released in April 2022. In November 2022, Variety reported that Warner Bros. Discovery was not actively planning to continue the film series or to develop any further films related to the Wizarding World franchise.

=== Personal life ===
By 1998, Rowling was portrayed in the media as a "penniless divorcee hitting the jackpot". According to her biographer Sean Smith, the publicity became effective marketing for Harry Potter, but her journey from living on benefits to wealth brought, along with fame, concerns from different groups about the books' portrayals of the occult and gender roles. Ultimately, Smith says that these concerns served to "enhance [her] public profile rather than damage it".

Rowling identifies as a Christian. Although she grew up next door to her church, accounts of the family's church attendance differ. (Note: Smith writes that the Rowling sisters "never attended Sunday school or services", and Parker writes that the other Rowling family members were not regular churchgoers, but that "Rowling regularly attended services in the church next door".) She began attending a Church of Scotland congregation, where Jessica was christened, around the time she was writing Harry Potter. In a 2012 interview, she said she belonged to the Scottish Episcopal Church. Rowling has stated that she believes in God, but has experienced doubt. She does not believe in magic or witchcraft.

Rowling married Neil Murray, a doctor, in 2001. The couple intended to marry that July in the Galapagos, but when this leaked to the press, they delayed their wedding and changed their holiday destination to Mauritius. After the UK Press Complaints Commission ruled that a magazine had breached Jessica's privacy when the eight-year-old was included in a photograph of the family taken during that trip, Murray and Rowling sought a more private and quiet place to live and work. Rowling bought Killiechassie, an estate house in Perthshire, Scotland, and on 26 December 2001, the couple had a small, private wedding there, officiated by an Episcopalian priest who travelled from Edinburgh. Their son, David Gordon Rowling Murray, was born in 2003, and their daughter Mackenzie Jean Rowling Murray in 2005.

In 2004, Forbes named Rowling "the first billion-dollar author". Rowling denied that she was a billionaire in a 2005 interview. By 2012, Forbes concluded she was no longer a billionaire due to her charitable donations and high UK taxes, but it re-added her to its list of billionaires in 2025. She was named the world's highest paid author by Forbes in 2008, 2017 and 2019. Her UK sales total in excess of £238 million, which made her the best-selling living author in Britain, until 2025 when she was supplanted by Julia Donaldson. The 2026 Sunday Times Rich List estimated Rowling's fortune at £975 million, ranking her as the 159th-richest person in the UK, and The National reported her net worth in 2025 as £945 million. As of 2020, she owns a £4.5 million Georgian house in Kensington and a £2 million home in Edinburgh, where she lives with her family.

In February 2026, J. K. Rowling was listed on the Sunday Times Tax list with an estimated £47.5 million.

=== Adult fiction and Robert Galbraith ===
In mid-2011, Rowling left Christopher Little Literary Agency and followed her agent Neil Blair to the Blair Partnership. He represented her for the publication of The Casual Vacancy, released in September 2012 by Little, Brown and Company. It was Rowling's first since Harry Potter ended, and her first book for adults. A contemporary take on 19th-century British fiction about village life, Casual Vacancy was promoted as a black comedy, while the critic Ian Parker described it as a "rural comedy of manners". It was adapted to a miniseries co-created by the BBC and HBO.

Little, Brown and Company also published The Cuckoo's Calling, the purported début novel of Robert Galbraith, in April 2013. Telling the story of a detective named Cormoran Strike, a disabled veteran of the War in Afghanistan, it initially sold 1,500 copies in hardback. After an investigation prompted by discussion on Twitter, the journalist Richard Brooks contacted Rowling's agent, who confirmed Galbraith was Rowling's pseudonym. Rowling later said she enjoyed working as Robert Galbraith, a name she took from Robert F. Kennedy, a personal hero, and Ella Galbraith, a name she invented for herself in childhood. After the revelation of her identity, sales of Cuckoo's Calling escalated.

Continuing the Cormoran Strike series of detective novels, The Silkworm was released in 2014; Career of Evil in 2015; Lethal White in 2018; Troubled Blood in 2020; The Ink Black Heart in 2022; The Running Grave in 2023; and The Hallmarked Man, which was released in September 2025. In 2017, BBC One aired the first episode of the five-season series Strike, a television adaptation of the Cormoran Strike novels starring Tom Burke and Holliday Grainger, with a sixth season broadcast in 2024, and a seventh series filmed in 2025–2026. The series was picked up by HBO for distribution in the United States and Canada.

=== Later Harry Potter works ===
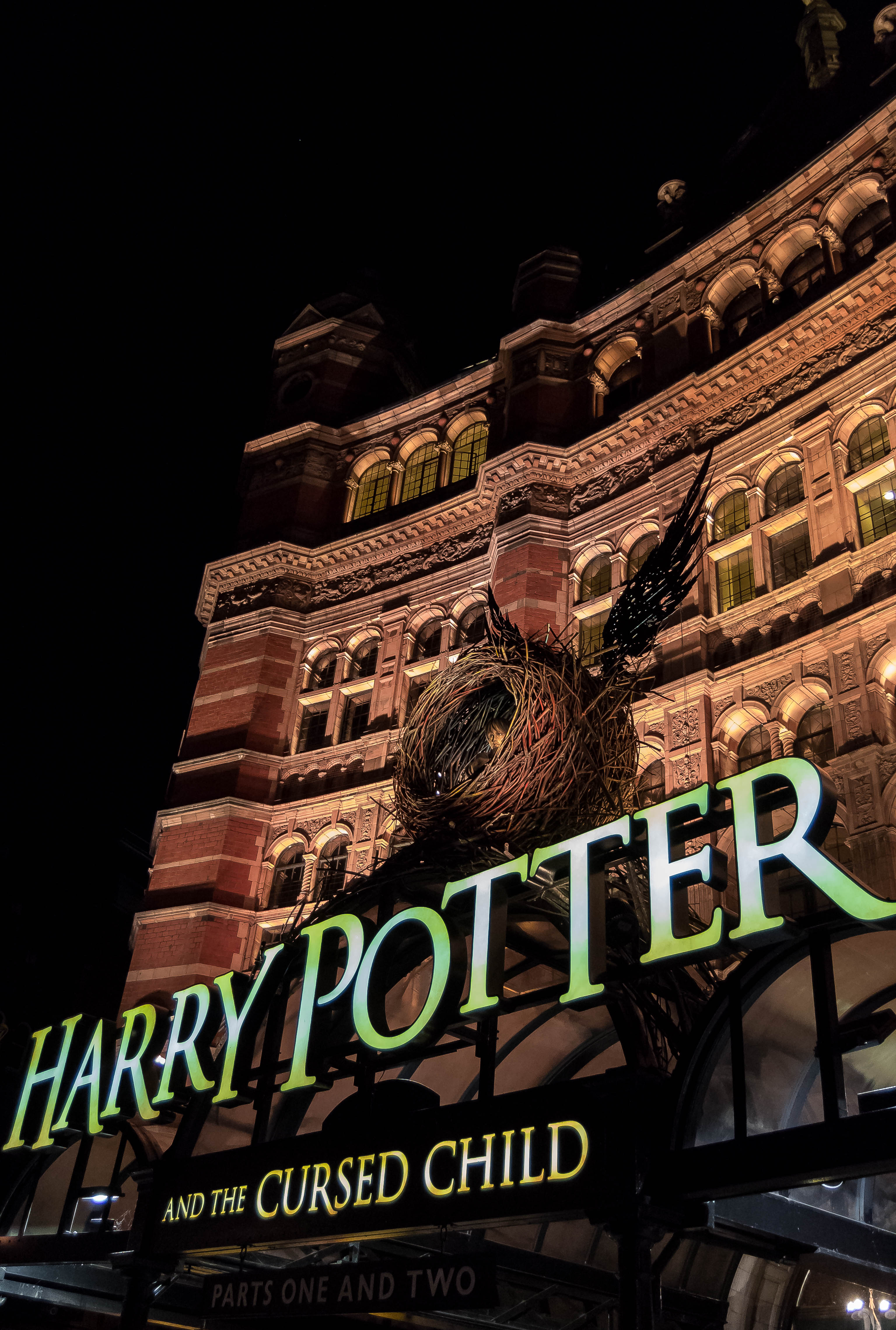
Harry Potter and the Cursed Child at the Palace Theatre in the West End, 2017

Harry Potter and the Cursed Child, written by Jack Thorne in collaboration with Rowling and John Tiffany, premiered in the West End in July 2016 and on Broadway in April 2018. At its London premiere, Rowling confirmed that she would not write any more Harry Potter books. The stage play's script was published as a book in July 2016. The play follows the friendship between Harry's son Albus and Scorpius Malfoy, Draco Malfoy's son, at Hogwarts.

Announced in April 2023, the Harry Potter television series will begin in 2026, span ten years of production and feature a series dedicated to each of the seven Harry Potter books, with Rowling as executive producer.

=== Children's stories ===
The Ickabog was Rowling's first book aimed at children since Harry Potter. Ickabog is a monster that turns out to be real; a group of children uncover the truth about the Ickabog and resolve the situation. Rowling released The Ickabog free online in mid-2020, during the COVID-19 lockdown in the United Kingdom. She began writing it in 2009 but set it aside to focus on other works including Casual Vacancy. Scholastic held a competition to select children's art for the print edition, which was published in the US and Canada on 10 November 2020. Profits went to charities focused on COVID-19 relief.

In The Christmas Pig, a young boy loses his favourite stuffed animal, a pig, and the Christmas Pig guides him through the fantastical Land of the Lost to retrieve it. The novel was published on 12 October 2021 and became a bestseller in the UK and the US.

== Influences ==
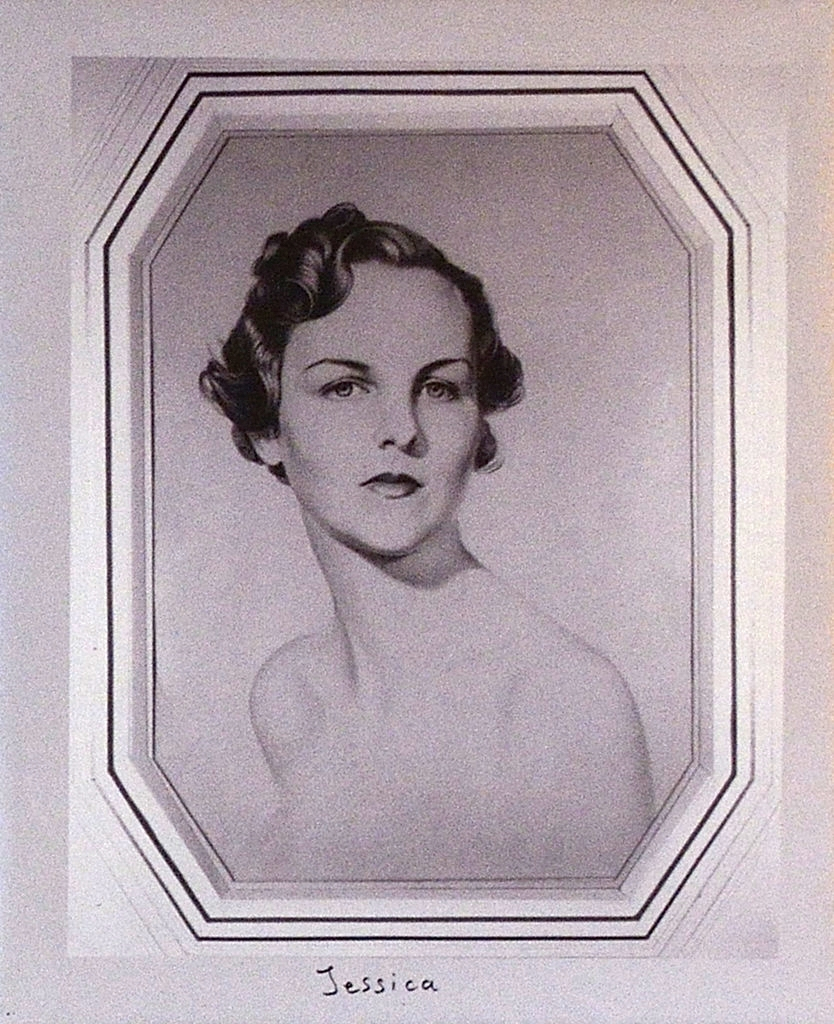
Rowling describes Jessica Mitford as her greatest influence.

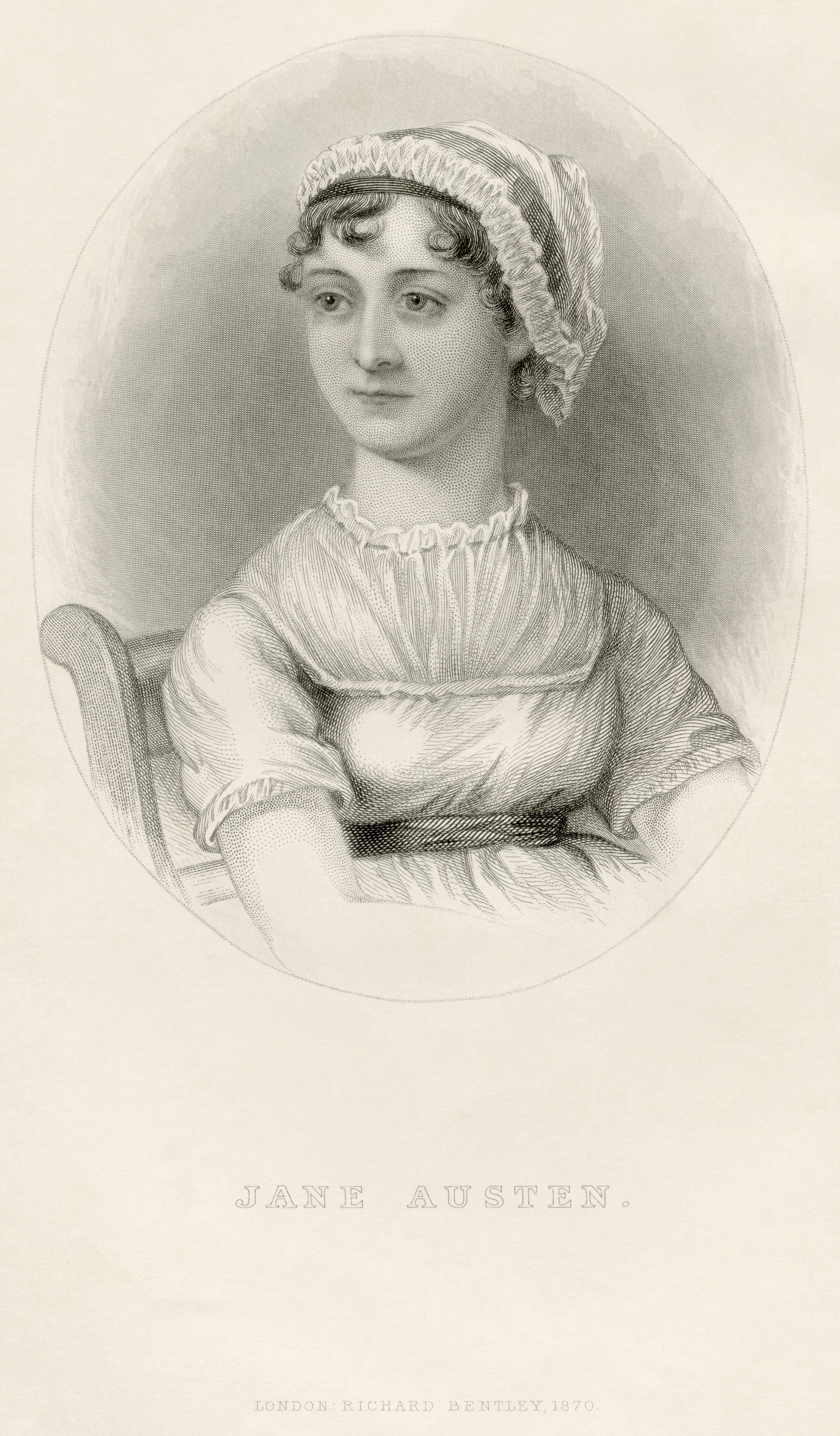
Jane Austen is Rowling's favourite writer.

Rowling has named Jessica Mitford as her greatest influence. She said Mitford had "been my heroine since I was 14 years old, when I overheard my formidable great-aunt discussing how Mitford had run away at the age of 19 to fight with the Reds in the Spanish Civil War", and that what inspired her about Mitford was that she was "incurably and instinctively rebellious, brave, adventurous, funny and irreverent, she liked nothing better than a good fight, preferably against a pompous and hypocritical target". As a child, Rowling read C. S. Lewis's The Chronicles of Narnia, Elizabeth Goudge's The Little White Horse, Manxmouse by Paul Gallico, and books by E. Nesbit and Noel Streatfeild. Rowling describes Jane Austen as her "favourite author of all time".

Rowling acknowledges Homer, Geoffrey Chaucer and William Shakespeare as literary influences. Scholars agree that Harry Potter is heavily influenced by the children's fantasy of writers such as Lewis, Goudge, Nesbit, J. R. R. Tolkien, Ursula K. Le Guin and Diana Wynne Jones. According to the critic Beatrice Groves, Harry Potter is also "rooted in the Western literary tradition", including the classics. Commentators also note similarities to the children's stories of Enid Blyton and Roald Dahl. Rowling expresses admiration for Lewis, in whose writing battles between good and evil are also prominent, but rejects any connection with Dahl.

Earlier works prominently featuring characters who learn to use magic include Le Guin's Earthsea series, in which a school of wizardry also appears, and the Chrestomanci books by Jones. Rowling's setting of a "school of witchcraft and wizardry" departs from the still older tradition of protagonists as apprentices to magicians, exemplified by The Sorcerer's Apprentice: yet this trope does appear in Harry Potter, when Harry receives individual instruction from Remus Lupin and other teachers. Rowling also draws on the tradition of stories set in boarding schools, a major example of which is Thomas Hughes's 1857 volume Tom Brown's School Days.

== Style and themes ==
=== Style and allusions ===
Rowling is known primarily as an author of fantasy and children's literature. Her writing in other genres, including literary fiction and crime fiction, has received less critical attention. Rowling's most famous work, Harry Potter, has been defined as a fairy tale, a bildungsroman and a boarding-school story. Her other writings have been described by Pugh as gritty contemporary fiction with historical influences (The Casual Vacancy) and hardboiled detective fiction (Cormoran Strike).

In Harry Potter, Rowling juxtaposes the extraordinary against the ordinary. Her narrative features two worlds – the mundane and the fantastic – but it differs from typical portal fantasy in that its magical elements stay grounded in the everyday. Paintings move and talk; books bite readers; letters shout messages; and maps show live journeys, making the wizarding world "both exotic and cosily familiar" according to the scholar Catherine Butler. This blend of realistic and romantic elements extends to Rowling's characters. Harry is ordinary and relatable, with down-to-earth features such as wearing broken glasses; these elements serve to highlight Harry when he is heroic, making him both an everyman and a fairytale hero.

Arthurian, Christian and fairytale motifs are frequently found in Rowling's writing. Harry's ability to draw the Sword of Gryffindor from the Sorting Hat resembles the Arthurian sword in the stone legend. His life with the Dursleys has been compared to Cinderella. Like C. S. Lewis's The Chronicles of Narnia, Harry Potter contains Christian symbolism and allegory. The series has been viewed as a Christian moral fable in the psychomachia tradition, in which stand-ins for good and evil fight for supremacy over a person's soul. The critic of children's literature Joy Farmer sees parallels between Harry and Jesus Christ. According to Maria Nikolajeva, Christian imagery is particularly strong in the final scenes of the series: she writes that Harry dies in self-sacrifice and Voldemort delivers an ecce homo speech, after which Harry is resurrected and defeats his enemy.

=== Themes ===
Death is Rowling's overarching theme in Harry Potter. She later said that her literary creation of the Mirror of Erised is about her mother's death. In the first book, when Harry looks into the mirror, he feels both joy and "a terrible sadness" at seeing his desire: his parents, alive and with him. Confronting their loss is central to Harry's character arc and manifests in different ways through the series, such as in his struggles with Dementors. Other characters in Harry's life die; he even faces his own death in Harry Potter and the Deathly Hallows. Soon after she started writing Philosopher's Stone, her mother died, and she said that "I really think from that moment on, death became a central, if not the central theme of the seven books". Rowling has described Harry as "the prism through which I view death", and further stated that "all of my characters are defined by their attitude to death and the possibility of death".

While Harry Potter can be viewed as a story about good versus evil, its moral divisions are not absolute. First impressions of characters are often misleading. Harry assumes in the first book that Quirrell is good because he opposes Snape, who appears malicious; in reality, their positions are reversed. In Rowling's world, good and evil are choices rather than inherent attributes: second chances and redemption are key themes of the series.

== Reception ==
Rowling has enjoyed enormous commercial success as an author. Her Harry Potter series topped bestseller lists, spawned a global media franchise including films and video games, and had been translated into 85 languages by 2023. The first three Harry Potter books occupied the top three spots of The New York Times bestseller list for more than a year; they were then moved to a newly created children's list. The final four books each set records as the fastest-selling books in the UK or US, (Note: Attributed to multiple sources – Goblet of Fire, Order of the Phoenix, Half-Blood Prince, and Deathly Hallows) and the series as a whole had sold more than 600 million copies as of 2023. Neither of Rowling's later works, The Casual Vacancy and the Cormoran Strike series, has been as successful, although Casual Vacancy was still a bestseller in the UK within weeks of its release. Harry Potter's popularity has been attributed to factors including the nostalgia evoked by the boarding-school story, the endearing nature of Rowling's characters, and the accessibility of her books to a variety of readers. According to Julia Eccleshare, the books are "neither too literary nor too popular, too difficult nor too easy, neither too young nor too old", and hence bridge traditional reading divides.

Critical response to Harry Potter has been more mixed. Harold Bloom regarded Rowling's prose as poor and her plots as conventional, while Jack Zipes argues that the series would not be successful if it were not formulaic. Zipes states that the early novels have the same plot: in each book, Harry escapes the Dursleys to visit Hogwarts, where he confronts Lord Voldemort and then heads back successful. Rowling's prose has been described as simple and not innovative; the author Ursula K. Le Guin, like several other critics, considered it "stylistically ordinary". According to the novelist A. S. Byatt, the books reflect a dumbed-down culture dominated by soap operas and reality television. Thus, some critics argue, Harry Potter does not innovate on established literary forms; nor does it challenge readers' preconceived ideas. Conversely, the scholar Philip Nel rejects such critiques as "snobbery" that reacts to the novels' popularity, whereas Mary Pharr argues that Harry Potter's conventionalism is the point: by amalgamating literary forms familiar to her readers, Rowling invites them to "ponder their own ideas". Other critics who see artistic merit in Rowling's writing include Marina Warner, who views Harry Potter as part of an "alternative genealogy" of English literature that she traces from Edmund Spenser to Christina Rossetti. Michiko Kakutani praises Rowling's fictional world and the darker tone of the series' later entries.

Reception of Rowling's later works has varied among critics. The Casual Vacancy, her attempt at literary fiction, drew mixed reviews. Some critics praised its characterisation, while others stated that it would have been better if it had contained magic. The Cormoran Strike series was more warmly received as a work of British detective fiction, even as some reviewers noted that its plots are occasionally contrived. Theatrical reviews of Harry Potter and the Cursed Child were highly positive. Fans have been more critical of the play's use of time travel, changes to characters' personalities, and perceived queerbaiting in Albus and Scorpius's relationship, leading some to question its connection to the Harry Potter canon.

=== Gender and social division ===
Rowling's portrayal of women in Harry Potter has been described as complex and varied, but nonetheless conforming to stereotypical and patriarchal depictions of gender. Gender divides are ostensibly absent in the books: Hogwarts is coeducational and women hold positions of power in wizarding society. However, this setting obscures the typecasting of female characters and the general depiction of conventional gender roles. According to the scholars Elizabeth Heilman and Trevor Donaldson, the subordination of female characters goes further early in the series. The final three books "showcase richer roles and more powerful females": for instance, the series' "most matriarchal character", Molly Weasley, engages substantially in the final battle of Deathly Hallows, while other women are shown as leaders. Hermione Granger, in particular, becomes an active and independent character essential to the protagonists' battle against evil. Yet, even particularly capable female characters such as Hermione and Minerva McGonagall are placed in supporting roles, and Hermione's status as a feminist model is debated. Girls and women are frequently shown as emotional, defined by their appearance, and denied agency in family settings.

The social hierarchies in Rowling's magical world have been a matter of debate among scholars and critics. The primary antagonists of Harry Potter, Voldemort and his followers, believe blood purity is paramount, and that non-wizards, or "muggles", are subhuman. Their ideology of racial difference is depicted as unambiguously evil. However, the series cannot wholly reject racial division, according to several scholars, as it still depicts wizards as fundamentally superior to muggles. Blake and Zipes argue that numerous examples of wizardly superiority are depicted as "natural and comfortable". Thus, according to Gupta, Harry Potter depicts superior races as having a moral obligation of tolerance and altruism towards lesser races, rather than explicitly depicting equality.

Rowling's depictions of the status of magical non-humans is similarly debated. Discussing the slavery of house-elves within Harry Potter, scholars such as Brycchan Carey have praised the books' abolitionist sentiments, viewing Hermione's Society for the Promotion of Elfish Welfare as a model for younger readers' political engagement. Other critics, including Farah Mendlesohn, find the portrayal of house-elves extremely troublesome; they are written as happy in their slavery, and Hermione's efforts on their behalf are implied to be naïve. Pharr terms the house-elves a disharmonious element in the series, writing that Rowling leaves their fate hanging; at the end of Deathly Hallows, the elves remain enslaved and cheerful. More generally, the subordination of magical non-humans remains in place, unchanged by the defeat of Voldemort. Thus, scholars suggest, the series's message is essentially conservative; it sees no reason to transform social hierarchies, only being concerned with who holds positions of power.

=== Religious reactions ===
There have been attempts to ban Harry Potter around the world, especially in the United States, and in the Bible Belt in particular. The series topped the American Library Association's list of most challenged books in the first three years of its publication. In the following years, parents in several US cities launched protests against teaching it in schools. Some Christian critics, particularly Evangelical Christians, have claimed that the novels promote witchcraft and harm children; similar opposition has been expressed to the film adaptations. Criticism has taken two main forms: allegations that Harry Potter is a pagan text; and claims that it encourages children to oppose authority, derived mainly from Harry's rejection of the Dursleys, his guardians. The author and scholar Amanda Cockrell suggests that Harry Potter's popularity, and recent preoccupation with fantasy and the occult among Christian fundamentalists, explains why the series received particular opposition. Some groups of Shia and Sunni Muslims also argued that the series contained Satanic subtext, and it was banned in private schools in the United Arab Emirates by its Ministry of Education and Youth, which stated it contradicted Islamic values.

The Harry Potter books also have a group of vocal religious supporters who believe that Harry Potter espouses Christian values, or that the Bible does not prohibit the forms of magic described in the series. Christian analyses of the series have argued that it embraces ideals of friendship, loyalty, courage, love, and the temptation of power. After the final volume was published, Rowling said she intentionally incorporated Christian themes, in particular the idea that love may hold power over death. According to Farmer, it is a profound misreading to think that Harry Potter promotes witchcraft. The scholar Em McAvan writes that evangelical objections to Harry Potter are superficial, based on the presence of magic in the books: they do not attempt to understand the moral messages in the series.

== Legacy ==
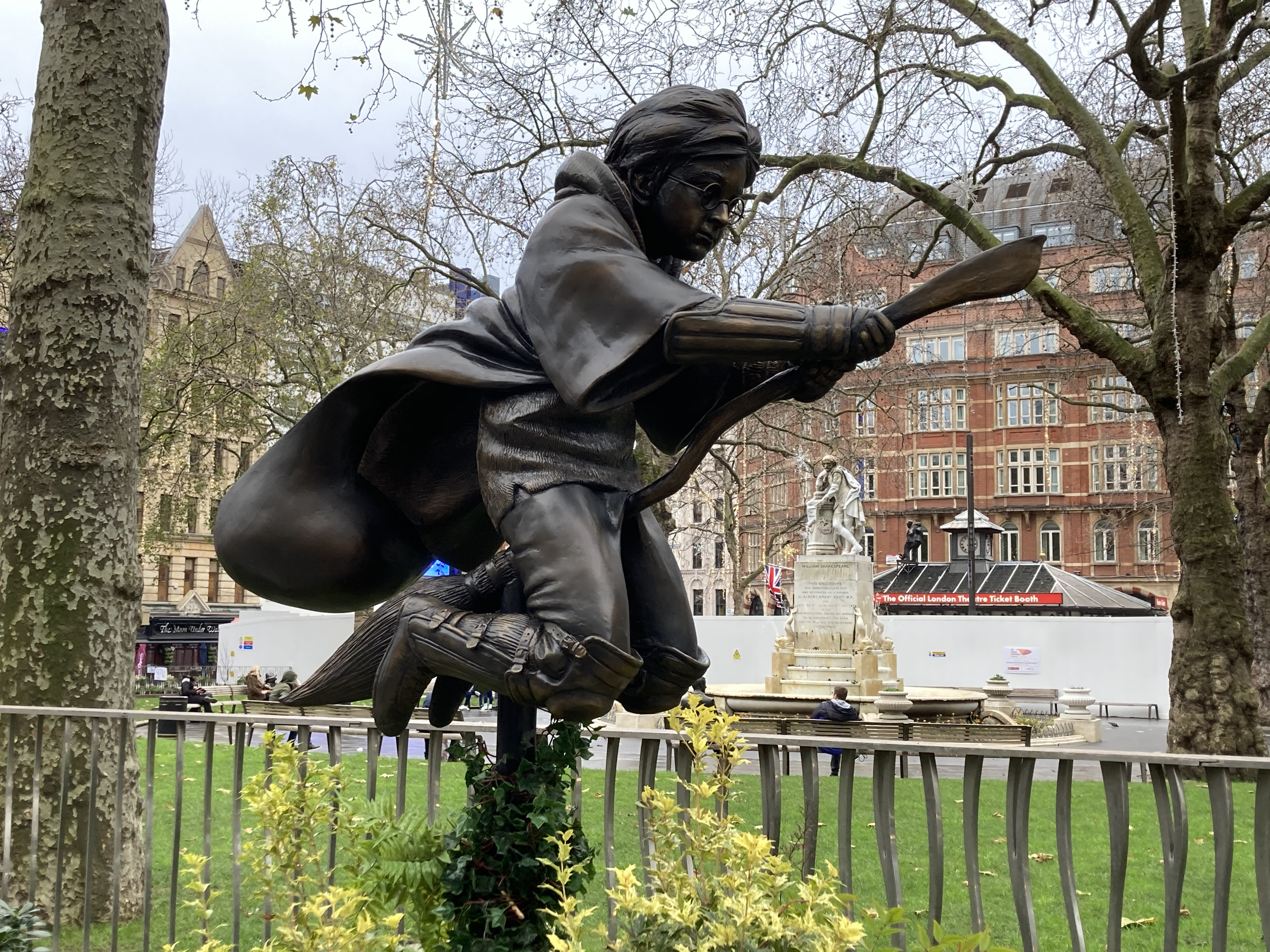
Sculpture of Harry Potter as part of the Scenes in the Square sculpture trail in Leicester Square, London, 2020

Rowling's Harry Potter series has been credited with a resurgence in crossover fiction: children's literature with an adult appeal. (Note: While noting the prevalent view that Harry Potter catalysed this change, the critic Rachel Falconer also credits socio-economic factors. In her view, Rowling's success is part of "a larger cultural change in contemporary Western society which accords greater weight and value to the signifier, the 'child', than in previous decades".) Crossovers were prevalent in 19th-century American and British fiction, but fell out of favour in the 20th century and did not occur at the same scale. The post-Harry Potter crossover trend is associated with the fantasy genre. In the 1970s, children's books were generally realistic as opposed to fantastic, while adult fantasy became popular because of the influence of The Lord of the Rings. The next decade saw an increasing interest in grim, realist themes, with an outflow of fantasy readers and writers to adult works.

The commercial success of Harry Potter in 1997 reversed this trend. The scale of its growth had no precedent in the children's market: within four years, it occupied 28% of that field by revenue. Children's literature rose in cultural status, and fantasy became a dominant genre. Older works of children's fantasy, including Diana Wynne Jones's Chrestomanci series and Diane Duane's Young Wizards, were reprinted and rose in popularity; some authors re-established their careers. In the following decades, many Harry Potter imitators and subversive responses grew popular.

Rowling has been compared with Enid Blyton, who also wrote in simple language about groups of children and long held sway over the British children's market. She has also been described as an heir to Roald Dahl. Some critics view Harry Potter's rise, along with the concurrent success of Philip Pullman's His Dark Materials, as part of a broader shift in reading tastes: a rejection of literary fiction in favour of plot and adventure. This is reflected in the BBC's 2003 "Big Read" survey of the UK's favourite books, where Pullman and Rowling ranked at numbers 3 and 5, respectively, with very few British literary classics in the top 10.

Harry Potter's popularity led its publishers to plan elaborate releases and fostered additional publications by fans and forgers after the books. Beginning with the release of Prisoner of Azkaban on 8 July 1999 at 3:45 pm, its publishers coordinated selling the books at the same time globally, introduced security protocols to prevent premature purchases, and required booksellers to agree not to sell copies before the appointed time. Driven by the growth of the internet, fan fiction about the series proliferated and has spawned a diverse community of readers and writers. While Rowling has supported fan fiction, her statements about characters made after the books were published, but not included in the books – for instance, that Harry and Hermione could have been a couple, and that Dumbledore was gay – have complicated her relationship with readers; (Note: According to Pugh, she only announced Dumbledore's sexuality to her fans, but not in the books, thus "closeting this character for unexplained reasons".) according to scholars, this shows that modern readers feel a sense of ownership over the text that is independent of, and sometimes contradicts, authorial intent.

== Legal disputes ==
In the 1990s and 2000s, Rowling was both a plaintiff and defendant in lawsuits alleging copyright infringement. Nancy Stouffer sued Rowling in 1999, alleging that Harry Potter was based on stories she published in 1984. Rowling won in September 2002. Richard Posner describes Stouffer's suit as deeply flawed and notes that the court, finding Stouffer had used "forged and altered documents", assessed a $50,000 penalty against her.

With her literary agents and Warner Bros., Rowling has brought legal action against publishers and writers of Harry Potter knockoffs in several countries. In mid-2000, Rowling and her publishers obtained a series of injunctions prohibiting sales or published reviews of her books before their official release dates.

Beginning in 2001, after Rowling sold film rights to Warner Bros., the studio tried to take Harry Potter fan sites offline unless it determined that they were made by "authentic" fans for innocuous purposes. In 2007, with Warner Bros., Rowling started proceedings to cease publication of a book based on content from a fan site called The Harry Potter Lexicon. The court held that Lexicon was neither a fair use of Rowling's material nor a derivative work, but it did not prevent the book from being published in a different form. Lexicon was published in 2009.

== Philanthropy ==
Rowling's charitable donations between 2005 and 2025 were estimated at over $250 million by Forbes, which also estimated she had donated $160 million before 2012. She was the second most generous UK donor in 2015 (following the singer Elton John), giving about $14 million. Her giving was $19 million in the year to 2026, according to the Sunday Times and Charities Aid Foundation.

In 2000, she established the Volant Charitable Trust, named after her mother to address social deprivation in at-risk women, children and youth, and to fund research into Multiple Sclerosis (MS). She advocates for better MS care, and said, "For me, being able to campaign and fund-raise for multiple sclerosis is the most personally meaningful thing to have come out of being famous." She was appointed president of One Parent Families (now Gingerbread) in 2004, after becoming its first ambassador in 2000. She collaborated with Sarah Brown on a book of children's stories to benefit One Parent Families. Together with the member of the European Parliament, Emma Nicholson, Rowling founded the charity now known as Lumos in 2005. Rowling has committed to covering all the core costs of Lumos, so that all other donations go directly to the work. Lumos has worked with orphanages in Ukraine, Romania, Haiti, and Colombia, and it had supported at least 280,000 children by 2025. She has donated several hundred thousand pounds to help women lawyers flee from the Taliban's control, helping hundreds of Afghans escape.

Rowling has made donations to support other medical causes. She named another institution after her mother in 2010, when she donated £10 million to found a multiple sclerosis research centre at the University of Edinburgh. She gave an additional £15.3 million to the centre in 2019. To support COVID-19 relief, she donated six-figure sums to both Khalsa Aid and the British Asian Trust from royalties from The Ickabog.

Several publications in the Harry Potter universe have been sold for charitable purposes. Profits from Fantastic Beasts and Where to Find Them and Quidditch Through the Ages, both published in 2001, went to Comic Relief. To support Children's Voice, later renamed Lumos, Rowling sold a deluxe copy of The Tales of Beedle the Bard at auction in 2007; Amazon's £1.95 million purchase set a record for a contemporary literary work and for children's literature. Rowling published the book and, in 2013, donated the proceeds of nearly £19 million (then about $30 million) to Lumos. Rowling and 12 other writers composed short pieces in 2008 to be sold to benefit Dyslexia Action and English PEN. Rowling's contribution was an 800-word Harry Potter prequel. (Note: The original Harry Potter prequel manuscript was stolen in 2017.) When the revelation that Rowling wrote The Cuckoo's Calling led to an increase in sales, she donated the royalties to ABF The Soldiers' Charity (formerly the Army Benevolent Fund).

== Views ==
Rowling was actively engaged on the internet before author webpages were common, and used Twitter to reach her Harry Potter fans and followers. She often uses sarcasm in tweets about her political opinions, sometimes generating controversy.

=== Politics ===
In 2008, Rowling donated £1 million to the Labour Party, endorsed the Labour prime minister Gordon Brown over his Conservative challenger David Cameron, and commended Labour's policies on child poverty. In June 2024, she wrote that she had a "poor opinion" of Keir Starmer and that it would be hard for her to vote for Labour due to their position on transgender rights, which she argues comes at the expense of women.

In her "Single mother's manifesto" published in The Times in 2010, Rowling criticised the prime minister David Cameron's plan to offer married couples an annual tax credit. She thought that the proposal discriminated against single parents, whose interests the Conservative Party failed to consider. Rowling opposed the 2014 Scottish independence referendum, and donated £1 million to the Better Together anti-independence campaign. She campaigned for the UK to stay in the European Union in the 2016 United Kingdom European Union membership referendum. She defined herself as an internationalist, "the mongrel product of this European continent", and expressed concern that "racists and bigots" were directing parts of the Leave campaign.

She opposed Israeli prime minister Benjamin Netanyahu, but refused to support a cultural boycott of Israel in 2015, believing that depriving Israel of shared culture would not dislodge him. In 2015, Rowling joined 150 others in signing a letter published in The Guardian in favour of cultural engagement with Israel.

=== Press ===
Rowling has a difficult relationship with the press and has tried to influence the type of coverage she receives. She described herself in 2003 as "too thin-skinned". As of 2011, she had taken more than 50 actions against the press. Rowling dislikes the British tabloid the Daily Mail, which she successfully sued in 2014 for libel about her time as a single mother.

The Leveson Inquiry into the British press named Rowling as a "core participant" in 2011. She was one of many celebrities alleged to have been victims of phone hacking. The following year she criticised Cameron's decision not to implement all the inquiry's recommendations and supported the Hacked Off campaign, pushing for stricter media reform.

=== Transgender people ===
Rowling has been described as a gender-critical feminist or trans-exclusionary radical feminist. She rejects what she calls "gender identity ideology" and argues that gender self-identification does not override sex in determining who is a woman. She is opposed to legislation that would allow transgender people to legally self-identify their gender without first receiving a medical diagnosis. She believes that women-only spaces should be defined by sex, which would prevent trans women from entering them. These views are often described as anti-trans or transphobic. Studies estimate that her positions and public profile make her an influential figure in the acceptability of transphobic discourse in the United Kingdom.

Rowling publicly supported transgender rights in a 2016 speech to PEN America, but she became concerned about proposals to simplify legal gender recognition and what she regarded as their potential consequences for women-only spaces, particularly in prisons and services for survivors of sexual violence. The case of Karen White, a transgender prisoner who sexually assaulted women while housed in a women's prison, became an important influence in strengthening her concerns. She spoke out in 2019 by defending Maya Forstater, whose employment contract was not renewed after she made a series of tweets questioning UK government plans to let people declare their own gender. (The Employment Appeal Tribunal later found that Forstater had been discriminated against.) (Note: An appeals court ruled in 2021 that Forstater's gender-critical views were protected under the 2010 UK Equality Act after the original employment tribunal found they were not. In July 2022, a new tribunal decision was published (Forstater v Center for Global Development Europe) ruling that Forstater had suffered direct discrimination from her employer.) Rowling wrote that transgender people should live in "peace and security" but said she opposed "forc[ing] women out of their jobs for stating that sex is real". According to the Harry Potter scholar Lana Whited, in the next six months "Rowling herself fanned the flames as she became increasingly vocal".

Rowling has opposed proposed gender self-recognition law reforms in the UK that would make it easier for trans people to change their legal gender, and financially supported the gender-critical feminist (Note: "For Women Scotland (FWS) [is] a gender critical (the belief that biological sex is immutable, coupled with the rejection of transgender or non-binary identities) organisation." and "GC feminist organizations, such as For Women Scotland, Fair Play for Women, and the UK-wide LGB Alliance, emerged largely in response to the proposed reforms.") campaign group For Women Scotland in the landmark UK Supreme Court case For Women Scotland Ltd v The Scottish Ministers. According to the media scholar Jennifer Duggan, Rowling has suggested on social media that children and cisgender women are threatened by trans women and trans-positive messages. Responding to an online op-ed that used the words people who menstruate, Rowling mocked the phrase and tweeted that women's rights and "lived reality" would be "erased" if "sex isn't real". Following the strengthening of a hate crime law in Scotland in April 2024, she tweeted a list of trans women, writing that they are "men, every last one of them" and challenging the police to arrest her. In 2024, Variety wrote that Rowling had "made her campaign against trans identity the central focus of her online persona".

Rowling denies that her views are transphobic, although she regularly makes comments on social media attacking trans women and trans activists. Her public expression of her views has prompted declarations of support for transgender people from the literary, music, theme park, and video gaming sectors as well as fuelling debates on freedom of speech and cancel culture. She has been the target of widespread condemnation for her comments, with negative reactions including insults and death threats. Criticism came from Harry Potter fansites, LGBT charities, leading actors of the Wizarding World franchise, and the Human Rights Campaign. After Kerry Kennedy expressed "profound disappointment" in her views, Rowling returned the Ripple of Hope Award given to her by the Robert F. Kennedy Human Rights organisation.

During her advocacy in 2022 against the Scottish Parliament's bill to simplify changing one's legal gender, Rowling founded Beira's Place with her own funds, a women-only rape help centre that provides free support services to survivors of sexual violence. The centre does not employ or serve trans women. In 2025, she opened the J.K. Rowling Women's Fund, which supports groups advocating for "sex-based rights" for women; in describing the group, NBC says that while the fund makes no mention of trans people directly, this terminology is frequently used by "proponents of efforts to restrict trans rights".

== Awards and honours ==
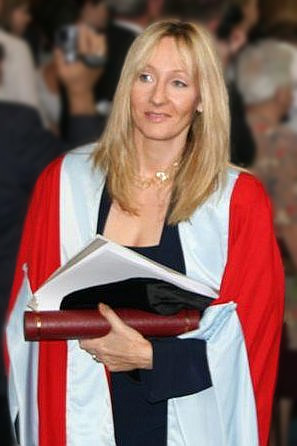
Rowling receiving an honorary doctorate from the University of Aberdeen, 2006

Rowling's Harry Potter series has won awards for general literature, children's literature, and speculative fiction. It has earned multiple British Book Awards, beginning with the Children's Book of the Year for the first two volumes, Philosopher's Stone and Chamber of Secrets. The third novel, Prisoner of Azkaban, was nominated for an adult award, the Whitbread Book of the Year, where it competed against the Nobel Prize laureate Seamus Heaney's translation of Beowulf. The award body gave Rowling the children's prize instead (worth half the cash amount), which some scholars felt exemplified a literary prejudice against children's books. She won the World Science Fiction Convention's Hugo Award for the fourth book, Goblet of Fire, and the British Book Awards' adult prize – the Book of the Year – for the sixth novel, Half-Blood Prince.

Rowling was appointed Officer of the Order of the British Empire (OBE) in the 2000 Birthday Honours for services to children's literature, and three years later received Spain's Prince of Asturias Award for Concord. Following the conclusion of the Harry Potter series, she won the Outstanding Achievement Prize at the 2008 British Book Awards. The next year, she was awarded Chevalier de la Légion d'Honneur (English: Knight of the Legion of Honour) by the French president Nicolas Sarkozy, and leading magazine editors named her the "Most Influential Woman in the UK" in 2010. In the 2017 Birthday Honours, Rowling was appointed a Member of the Order of the Companions of Honour (CH) for services to literature and philanthropy.

Many academic institutions have bestowed honorary degrees on Rowling, including her alma mater, the University of Exeter, and Harvard University, where she spoke at the 2008 commencement ceremony. In 2002, Rowling was elected as a Fellow of the Royal Society of Literature (FRSL) and awarded as an Honorary Fellow of the Royal Society of Edinburgh (HonFRSE). In 2011, she was recognised as a Fellow of the Royal College of Physicians of Edinburgh (FRCPE). Rowling was also awarded as Honorary Fellow of Exeter College (Oxford) in 2014, for the 'extraordinary contribution she has made to the field of literature, and in particular to children's reading and literacy'. She is furthermore a Fellow of the Society of Authors.

Rowling shared the British Academy Film Award (BAFTA) for Outstanding British Contribution to Cinema with the cast and crew of the Harry Potter films in 2011. Her other awards include the 2017 Laurence Olivier Award for Best New Play for Harry Potter and the Cursed Child, and the 2021 British Book Awards' Crime and Thriller prize for the fifth volume of her Cormoran Strike series.

== Written works ==
Publications by J.K. Rowling
| Target/ type | Series/ description | Title | Date | Ref. |
|---|---|---|---|---|
| Young adult fiction | Harry Potter series | 1. Harry Potter and the Philosopher's Stone | 26 Jun 1997 | |
| Young adult fiction | Harry Potter series | 2. Harry Potter and the Chamber of Secrets | 2 Jul 1998 | |
| Young adult fiction | Harry Potter series | 3. Harry Potter and the Prisoner of Azkaban | 8 Jul 1999 | |
| Young adult fiction | Harry Potter series | 4. Harry Potter and the Goblet of Fire | 8 Jul 2000 | |
| Young adult fiction | Harry Potter series | 5. Harry Potter and the Order of the Phoenix | 21 Jun 2003 | |
| Young adult fiction | Harry Potter series | 6. Harry Potter and the Half-Blood Prince | 16 Jul 2005 | |
| Young adult fiction | Harry Potter series | 7. Harry Potter and the Deathly Hallows | 21 Jul 2007 | |
| Young adult fiction | Harry Potter– related books | Fantastic Beasts and Where to Find Them (supplement to the Harry Potter series) | 12 Mar 2001 | |
| Young adult fiction | Harry Potter– related books | Quidditch Through the Ages (supplement to the Harry Potter series) | 12 Mar 2001 | |
| Young adult fiction | Harry Potter– related books | Harry Potter prequel (short story published in What's Your Story Postcard Collection) | 1 Jul 2008 | |
| Young adult fiction | Harry Potter– related books | The Tales of Beedle the Bard (supplement to the Harry Potter series) | 4 Dec 2008 | |
| Young adult fiction | Harry Potter– related books | Harry Potter and the Cursed Child (story concept for play) | 30 Jul 2016 premiere | |
| Young adult fiction | Harry Potter– related books | Short Stories from Hogwarts of Power, Politics and Pesky Poltergeists | 6 Sep 2016 | |
| Young adult fiction | Harry Potter– related books | Short Stories from Hogwarts of Heroism, Hardship and Dangerous Hobbies | 6 Sep 2016 | |
| Young adult fiction | Harry Potter– related books | Hogwarts: An Incomplete and Unreliable Guide | 6 Sep 2016 | |
| Young adult fiction | Harry Potter– related books | From the Wizarding Archive: Volumes 1 and 2 | 29 Aug 2024 | |
| Young adult fiction | Harry Potter– related original screenplays | Fantastic Beasts and Where to Find Them | 18 Nov 2016 | |
| Young adult fiction | Harry Potter– related original screenplays | Fantastic Beasts: The Crimes of Grindelwald | 16 Nov 2018 premiere | |
| Young adult fiction | Harry Potter– related original screenplays | Fantastic Beasts: The Secrets of Dumbledore | 15 Apr 2022 | |
| Adult fiction | | The Casual Vacancy | 27 Sep 2012 | |
| Adult fiction | Cormoran Strike series (as Robert Galbraith) | 1. The Cuckoo's Calling | 18 Apr 2013 | |
| Adult fiction | Cormoran Strike series (as Robert Galbraith) | 2. The Silkworm | 19 Jun 2014 | |
| Adult fiction | Cormoran Strike series (as Robert Galbraith) | 3. Career of Evil | 20 Oct 2015 | |
| Adult fiction | Cormoran Strike series (as Robert Galbraith) | 4. Lethal White | 18 Sep 2018 | |
| Adult fiction | Cormoran Strike series (as Robert Galbraith) | 5. Troubled Blood | 15 Sep 2020 | |
| Adult fiction | Cormoran Strike series (as Robert Galbraith) | 6. The Ink Black Heart | 30 Aug 2022 | |
| Adult fiction | Cormoran Strike series (as Robert Galbraith) | 7. The Running Grave | 26 Sep 2023 | |
| Adult fiction | Cormoran Strike series (as Robert Galbraith) | 8. The Hallmarked Man | 2 Sep 2025 | |
| Children's fiction | | The Ickabog | 10 Nov 2020 | |
| Children's fiction | | The Christmas Pig | 12 Oct 2021 | |
| Non-fiction | Books | Very Good Lives: The Fringe Benefits of Failure and Importance of Imagination, illustrated by Joel Holland, Sphere. | 14 Apr 2015 | |
| Non-fiction | Books | A Love Letter to Europe: an Outpouring of Love and Sadness from our Writers, Thinkers and Artists, Coronet (contributor). | 31 Oct 2019 | |
| Non-fiction | Books | The Women Who Wouldn't Wheesht, Constable (Contributor). | 30 May 2024 | |
| Non-fiction | Articles | "The first it girl: J. K. Rowling reviews Decca: the Letters by Jessica Mitford". Sussman, Peter Y., editor. The Daily Telegraph. | 26 Nov 2006 | |
| Non-fiction | Articles | "The fringe benefits of failure, and the importance of imagination". Harvard Magazine. | 5 Jun 2008 | |
| Non-fiction | Articles | "Gordon Brown – the 2009 Time 100". Time magazine. | 30 Apr 2009 | |
| Non-fiction | Articles | "The single mother's manifesto". The Times. | 14 Apr 2010 | |
| Non-fiction | Articles | "I feel duped and angry at David Cameron's reaction to Leveson". The Guardian. | 30 Nov 2012 | |
| Non-fiction | Articles | "Isn't it time we left orphanages to fairytales?" The Guardian. | 17 Dec 2014 | |
| Non-fiction | Articles | "Labour has dismissed women like me. I'll struggle to vote for it". The Times. | 21 Jun 2024 | |
| Book | Foreword/ Introduction | Reynolds, Kim; Cooling, Wendy, project consultants. Families Just Like Us: The One Parent Families Good Book Guide. National Council for One Parent Families; Book Trust. | 2000 | |
| Book | Foreword/ Introduction | McNeil, Gil; Brown, Sarah, editors. Magic. Bloomsbury. | 3 Jun 2002 | |
| Book | Foreword/ Introduction | Brown, Gordon. "Ending child poverty" in Moving Britain Forward. Selected Speeches 1997–2006. Bloomsbury. | 25 Sep 2006 | |
| Book | Foreword/ Introduction | Anelli, Melissa. Harry, A History. Pocket Books. | 4 Nov 2008 | |

== Filmography ==
=== Film ===
J. K. Rowling filmography
| Year | Title | Credited as | | Notes | Ref. |
| Year | Title | Screenwriter | Producer | Notes | Ref. |
|---|---|---|---|---|---|
| 2010 | Harry Potter and the Deathly Hallows – Part 1 | No | Yes | Film based on Harry Potter and the Deathly Hallows | |
| 2011 | Harry Potter and the Deathly Hallows – Part 2 | No | Yes | Film based on Harry Potter and the Deathly Hallows | |
| 2016 | Fantastic Beasts and Where to Find Them | Yes | Yes | Films inspired by the Harry Potter supplementary book Fantastic Beasts and Where to Find Them | |
| 2018 | Fantastic Beasts: The Crimes of Grindelwald | Yes | Yes | Films inspired by the Harry Potter supplementary book Fantastic Beasts and Where to Find Them | |
| 2022 | Fantastic Beasts: The Secrets of Dumbledore | Yes | Yes | Films inspired by the Harry Potter supplementary book Fantastic Beasts and Where to Find Them | |

=== Television ===
J. K. Rowling filmography
| Year(s) | Title | Credited as | | Notes | Ref. |
| Year(s) | Title | Voice actress | Executive producer | Notes | Ref. |
|---|---|---|---|---|---|
| 2003 | The Simpsons | Yes | No | Voice cameo in "The Regina Monologues" | |
| 2015 | The Casual Vacancy | No | Yes | Television miniseries based on The Casual Vacancy | |
| 2017–present | Strike | No | Yes | Television series based on Cormoran Strike novels | |
| 2026–present | Harry Potter | No | Yes | Television series based on Harry Potter novels; filming | |

== Works cited ==
=== Books ===
- Anatol, Giselle Liza, ed. (2003). Reading Harry Potter: Critical Essays. Praeger Publishers. ISBN 978-0-313-32067-5. OCLC 50774592.
  - Carey, Brycchan. "Hermione and the house-elves: the literary and historical contexts of J. K. Rowling's antislavery campaign". In Anatol 2003.
  - Gallardo, Ximena; Smith, C. Jason. "Cinderfella: J. K. Rowling's wily web of gender". In Anatol 2003.
  - Ostry, Elaine. "Accepting Mudbloods: the ambivalent social vision of J. K. Rowling's fairy tales". In Anatol 2003.
  - Park, Julia. "Class and socioeconomic identity in Harry Potter's England". In Anatol 2003.
  - Schanoes, Veronica L. "Cruel heroes and treacherous texts: educating the reader in moral complexity and critical reading in J. K. Rowling's Harry Potter books". In Anatol 2003.
- Anelli, Melissa (2008). Harry, a History: The True Story of a Boy Wizard, His Fans, and Life inside the Harry Potter Phenomenon. Pocket Books. ISBN 978-1-4165-5495-0. OCLC 209699636.
- Baker, Charles Robert (2010). "J. K. Rowling (1965–)". In Parini, Jay (ed.). British Writers: Supplement XVI. Charles Scribner's Sons; Gale. ISBN 978-0-684-31710-6. OCLC 645653286.
- Barratt, Bethany (2012). The Politics of Harry Potter. Palgrave Macmillan. doi:10.1057/9781137016546. ISBN 978-0-230-60899-3.
- Beckett, Sandra L. (2008). Crossover Fiction: Global and Historical Perspectives. Routledge. doi:10.4324/9780203893135. ISBN 978-0-203-89313-5.
- Bell, Christopher, ed. (2012). Hermione Granger Saves the World: Essays on the Feminist Heroine of Hogwarts. McFarland & Company. ISBN 978-0-7864-7137-9.
  - Bell, Christopher; Alexander, Julie. Introduction. In Bell 2012.
  - Berents, Helen. "Hermione Granger goes to war". In Bell 2012.
- Berberich, Christine, ed. (2015). The Bloomsbury Introduction to Popular Fiction. Bloomsbury Publishing. ISBN 978-1-4411-5567-2.
- Berndt, Katrin; Steveker, Lena, eds. (22 April 2016). Heroism in the Harry Potter Series. Routledge. doi:10.4324/9781315586748. ISBN 978-1-317-12211-1.
  - Berberich, Christine. "Harry Potter and the idea of the gentleman as hero". In Berndt & Steveker 2016.
  - Hopkins, Lisa. "Harry and his peers: Rowling's web of allusions". In Berndt & Steveker 2016.
  - McEvoy, Kathleen. "Heroism at the margins". In Berndt & Steveker 2016.
  - Pharr, Mary. "A paradox: the Harry Potter series as both epic and postmodern". In Berndt & Steveker 2016.
  - Singer, Rita. "Harry Potter and the battle for the soul: the revival of the psychomachia in secular fiction". In Berndt & Steveker 2016.
- Blake, Andrew (2002). The Irresistible Rise of Harry Potter. Verso Books. ISBN 1-85984-666-1. OCLC 49594480.
- Brummitt, Cassie; Sellars, Kieran (1 December 2019). "'Friends? Always': queerbaiting, ambiguity, and erasure in Harry Potter and the Cursed Child". In Brennan, Joseph (ed.). Queerbaiting and Fandom: Teasing Fans through Homoerotic Possibilities. University of Iowa Press. ISBN 978-1-60938-672-6. OCLC 1104912811.
- Butler, Catherine (2012). "Modern children's fantasy". In James, Edward; Mendlesohn, Farah (eds.). The Cambridge Companion to Fantasy Literature. Cambridge University Press. doi:10.1017/CCOL9780521429597. ISBN 978-0-521-42959-7.
- Eccleshare, Julia (2002). A Guide to the Harry Potter Novels. Continuum. ISBN 978-1-84714-418-8. OCLC 229341237.
- Errington, Philip W. (2017). J.K. Rowling: A Bibliography. Bloomsbury Publishing. ISBN 978-1-4742-9738-7.
- Falconer, Rachel (21 October 2008). The Crossover Novel: Contemporary Children's Fiction and Its Adult Readership. Routledge. doi:10.4324/9780203892176. ISBN 978-0-203-89217-6.
- Falconer, Rachel (2010). "Young adult fiction and the crossover phenomenon". In Rudd, David (ed.). The Routledge Companion to Children's Literature. Routledge. doi:10.4324/9780203889855. ISBN 978-0-203-88985-5. S2CID 220952112.
- Foerstel, Herbert N. (2002). Banned in the U.S.A.: A Reference Guide to Book Censorship in Schools and Public Libraries. Greenwood Press. ISBN 0-313-00670-9. OCLC 51782946.
- Gibson, Marion (2007). Witchcraft Myths in American Culture. Routledge. doi:10.4324/9780203941980. ISBN 978-0-415-97977-1. OCLC 76261870.
- Grenby, M. O. (5 December 2016). "General introduction". In Briggs, Julia; Butts, Dennis (eds.). Popular Children's Literature in Britain. Routledge. doi:10.4324/9781315246437. ISBN 978-1-351-91004-0.
- Groves, Beatrice (14 June 2017). Literary Allusion in Harry Potter. Routledge. doi:10.4324/9781315269337. ISBN 978-1-315-26933-7.
- Guanio-Uluru, Lykke (2015). Ethics and Form in Fantasy Literature. Palgrave Macmillan. doi:10.1057/9781137469694. ISBN 978-1-349-56000-4.
- Gunelius, Susan (2008). Harry Potter: The Story of a Global Business Phenomenon. Palgrave Macmillan. doi:10.1057/9780230594104. ISBN 978-0-230-59410-4.
- Gupta, Suman (2009). Re-Reading Harry Potter (2nd ed.). Palgrave Macmillan. doi:10.1057/9780230279711. ISBN 978-0-230-21958-8.
- Hahn, Daniel (2015). The Oxford Companion to Children's Literature (2nd ed.). Oxford University Press. ISBN 978-0-19-174437-2. OCLC 921452204.
- Heilman, Elizabeth E., ed. (7 August 2008). Critical Perspectives on Harry Potter (2nd ed.). Routledge. doi:10.4324/9780203892817. ISBN 978-1-135-89154-1.
  - Alton, Anne Hiebert. "Playing the genre game: generic fusions of the Harry Potter series". In Heilman 2008.
  - Applebaum, Peter. "The great Snape debate". In Heilman 2008.
  - Ciaccio, Peter. "Harry Potter and Christian theology". In Heilman 2008.
  - Dendle, Peter. "Monsters, creatures, and pets at Hogwarts: animal stewardship in the world of Harry Potter". In Heilman 2008.
  - Heilman, Elizabeth E.; Donaldson, Trevor. "From sexist to (sort-of) feminist representations of gender in the Harry Potter series". In Heilman 2008.
  - Nikolajeva, Maria. "Harry Potter and the secrets of children's literature". In Heilman 2008.
  - Taub, Deborah J.; Servaty-Seib, Heather L. "Controversial content: is Harry Potter harmful to children?". In Heilman 2008.
- Holmes, Tim (2015). Subediting and Production for Journalists: Print, Digital & Social (2nd ed.). Routledge. doi:10.4324/9780203143544. ISBN 978-0-415-49200-3.
- Jenkins, Henry (2006). Convergence Culture: Where Old and New Media Collide. New York University Press. ISBN 0-8147-4281-5. OCLC 64594290.
- Kirk, Connie Ann (2003). J.K. Rowling: A Biography. Greenwood Press. ISBN 0-313-32205-8. OCLC 49991592.
- Konchar Farr, Cecilia, ed. (2022). Open at the Close: Literary Essays on Harry Potter. University Press of Mississippi. ISBN 978-1-4968-3931-2.
  - Henderson, Tolonda. "A Coda: She-Who-Must-Not-Be-Named". In Konchar Farr 2022.
- Lai, Amy T.Y. (2023). "Chapter 7. The United Kingdom: Human Rights Act, a new bill, and the uncertain future of campus speech". In Defense of Free Speech in Universities: A Study of Three Jurisdictions. University of Michigan Press. pp. 155–196. doi:10.1353/book.113334. ISBN 978-0-472-90379-5.
- Levy, Michael; Mendlesohn, Farah (2016). Children's Fantasy Literature: An Introduction. Cambridge University Press. doi:10.1017/CBO9781139087421. ISBN 978-1-107-01814-3.
- Mamary, Anne J. M., ed. (22 December 2020). "Introduction". The Alchemical Harry Potter: Essays on Transfiguration in J. K. Rowling's Novels. McFarland & Company. ISBN 978-1-4766-8134-4. OCLC 1155570319.
- McAvan, Em (2012). "Harry Potter and the origins of the occult". In Hallett, Cynthia J.; Huey, Peggy J. (eds.). J. K. Rowling: Harry Potter. Palgrave Macmillan. ISBN 978-0-333-69345-2.
- Mendlesohn, Farah; James, Edward (2012). A Short History of Fantasy. Libri Publishing. ISBN 978-1-907471-66-7. OCLC 857653620.
- Miller, Lucy J. (2024). "J. K. Rowling's anti-trans rhetoric: populist transantagonism". Quarterly Journal of Speech. 110 (3): 479–488. doi:10.1080/00335630.2024.2368562. ISSN 0033-5630.
- Nel, Philip (2001). J.K. Rowling's Harry Potter Novels: A Reader's Guide. Continuum. ISBN 0-8264-5232-9. OCLC 47050453.
- Pember, Don R.; Calvert, Clay (2007). Mass Media Law. McGraw-Hill Higher Education. ISBN 978-0-07-312685-2. OCLC 70910938.
- Posner, Richard A. (2007). The Little Book of Plagiarism. Pantheon Books. ISBN 978-0-375-42475-5. OCLC 70823133.
- Pugh, Tison (2020). Harry Potter and Beyond: On J. K. Rowling's Fantasies and Other Fictions. University of South Carolina Press. doi:10.2307/j.ctvs09qwv. ISBN 978-1-64336-088-1. OCLC 1142046769. S2CID 225791872.
- Salter, Anastasia; Stanfill, Mel (16 October 2020). A Portrait of the Auteur as Fanboy: The Construction of Authorship in Transmedia Franchises. University Press of Mississippi. ISBN 978-1-4968-3051-7. OCLC 1178868864.
- Schmidt, Solomon (23 June 2026). A Pen to Change the World: The Life of J.K. Rowling. Simon and Schuster. ISBN 978-1-64821-098-3.
- Schwirblat, Tatiana; Freberg, Karen; Freberg, Laura (2022). "Chapter 21: Cancel culture: a career vulture amongst influencers on social media". In Lipschultz, Jeremy Harris; Freberg, Karen; Luttrell, Regina (eds.). The Emerald Handbook of Computer-Mediated Communication and Social Media. Emerald Publishing Limited. doi:10.1108/978-1-80071-597-420221021. ISBN 978-1800715981.
- Smith, Sean (2002). J.K. Rowling: A Biography. Arrow Books. ISBN 0-09-944542-5. OCLC 51303518.
- Stableford, Brian M. (2009). The A to Z of Fantasy Literature. Scarecrow Press. ISBN 978-0-8108-6345-3. OCLC 1200815959.
- Striphas, Theodore G. (2009). "Harry Potter and the culture of the copy". The Late Age of Print: Everyday Book Culture from Consumerism to Control. Columbia University Press. pp. 141–174. ISBN 978-0-231-14814-6. OCLC 256532755.
- Sunderland, Jane; Dempster, Steven; Thistlethwaite, Joanne (31 March 2016). Children's Literacy Practices and Preferences. Routledge. doi:10.4324/9781315732350. ISBN 978-1317554738.
- Thomas, Ebony Elizabeth (2019). The Dark Fantastic: Race and the Imagination from Harry Potter to the Hunger Games. New York University Press. ISBN 978-1-4798-0065-0. OCLC 1104862747.
- Westman, Karin E. (2006). "Rowling, J. K.". In Kastan, David Scott (ed.). The Oxford Encyclopedia of British Literature. Oxford University Press. doi:10.1093/acref/9780195169218.001.0001. ISBN 978-0-19-516921-8. Archived from the original on 21 March 2022.
- Westman, Karin E. (2011). "Blending genres and crossing audiences: and the future of literary fiction". In Vallone, Lynne; Mickenberg, Julia (eds.). The Oxford Handbook of Children's Literature. Oxford University Press. doi:10.1093/oxfordhb/9780195379785.013.0005. ISBN 978-0-19-537978-5.
- Whited, Lana A., ed. (2002). The Ivory Tower and Harry Potter: Perspectives on a Literary Phenomenon. University of Missouri Press. ISBN 978-0-8262-6330-8. OCLC 56424948.
  - Doughty, Terri. "Locating Harry Potter in the 'Boys' Book' market". In Whited 2002.
  - Mendlesohn, Farah. "Crowning the king: Harry Potter and the construction of authority". In Whited 2002.
  - Natov, Roni. "Harry Potter and the extraordinariness of the ordinary". In Whited 2002.
  - Pinsent, Pat. "The education of a wizard: Harry Potter and his predecessors". In Whited 2002.
  - Teare, Elizabeth. "Harry Potter and the technology of magic". In Whited 2002.
- Whited, Lana A. (2015). "A survey of the critical reception of the Harry Potter series". In Grimes, M. Katherine; Whited, Lana A. (eds.). Critical Insights: The Harry Potter Series. Salem Press. ISBN 978-1-61925-520-3. EBSCOhost 108515151.
- Whited, Lana A., ed. (2024). The Ivory Tower, Harry Potter, and Beyond. University of Missouri Press. ISBN 978-0-8262-2300-5.
  - Whited, Lana A. Introduction. In Whited (ed) 2024.
- Zipes, Jack (15 November 2013) [2002]. Sticks and Stones: The Troublesome Success of Children's Literature from Slovenly Peter to Harry Potter. Routledge. doi:10.4324/9780203700211. ISBN 978-0-203-70021-1.

=== Journal articles ===
- Birch, Chellyce (2016). "Harry Potter and the Cursed Child". Limina. 22 (1): 96–97.
- Brummitt, Cassie (2016). "Pottermore: transmedia storytelling and authorship in Harry Potter". The Midwest Quarterly. 58 (1). ProQuest 1832925509.
- Cockrell, Amanda (February 2006). "Harry Potter and the witch hunters: a social context for the attacks on Harry Potter". The Journal of American Culture. 29 (6): 24–30. doi:10.1111/j.1542-734X.2006.00272.x. ISSN 1542-7331.
- Duggan, Jennifer (28 March 2021). "Transformative readings: Harry Potter fan fiction, trans/queer reader response, and J. K. Rowling". Children's Literature in Education. 53 (2): 147–168. doi:10.1007/s10583-021-09446-9. PMC 9132366. PMID 35645426. S2CID 233661189.
- Eberhardt, Maeve (2017). "Gendered representations through speech: The case of the Harry Potter series". Language and Literature. 26 (3): 227–246. doi:10.1177/0963947017701851. S2CID 149129001.
- Farmer, Joy (2001). "The magician's niece: the kinship between J. K. Rowling and C. S. Lewis". Mythlore. 23 (2): 53–64. JSTOR 26814627. Archived from the original on 16 August 2023.
- Horne, Jackie C. (2010). "Harry and the other: answering the race question in J. K. Rowling's Harry Potter". The Lion and the Unicorn. 34 (1): 76–104. doi:10.1353/uni.0.0488. S2CID 143738308. ProQuest 221753179.
- Maine, Alexander (3 July 2025). "For Women Scotland: an interpretation of equality rooted in biology". Journal of Social Welfare and Family Law. 47 (2–3): 377–380. doi:10.1080/09649069.2025.2530887. ISSN 0964-9069.
- McRobbie, Angela (3 May 2025). "On phantasms of gender: A feminist cultural studies perspective". European Journal of Cultural Studies 13675494251335555. doi:10.1177/13675494251335555.
- Molin, Peter C. (2015). "A 'phrase too cute to do our ugliness justice': portraying 'wounded warriors' in contemporary war fiction" (PDF). War, Literature & the Arts. 27: 1–21. ProQuest 1813553141. Archived from the original (PDF) on 5 July 2022.
- Nel, Philip (2005). "Is there a text in this advertising campaign?: literature, marketing, and Harry Potter". The Lion and the Unicorn. 29 (2): 236–267. doi:10.1353/uni.2005.0031. S2CID 143828096. ProQuest 221753999.
- Pape, Madeleine (2022). "Feminism, trans justice, and speech rights: a comparative perspective". Law and Contemporary Problems. 85 (1): 215–240. Archived from the original on 20 March 2022.
- Pugh, Tison; Wallace, David L. (Fall 2006). "Heteronormative heroism and queering the school story in J.K. Rowling's Harry Potter series". Children's Literature Association Quarterly. 31 (3): 260–281. doi:10.1353/chq.2006.0053. S2CID 143508785.
- Quealy-Gainer, Kate (2020). "The Ickabog by J. K. Rowling (review)". The Bulletin of the Center for Children's Books. 74 (5): 231. doi:10.1353/bcc.2020.0950. S2CID 242633369. Project MUSE 776213.
- Richards, Kitty (2017). "An expressive theory of tax". Cornell Journal of Law and Public Policy. 27 (2): 301–355. Archived from the original on 4 April 2023.
- Schwabach, Aaron (2009). "The Harry Potter Lexicon and the world of fandom: fan fiction, outsider works, and copyright". University of Pittsburgh Law Review. 70 (3): 387–434. SSRN 1274293 – via HeinOnline.
- Tosenberger, Catherine (2008). "Homosexuality at the online Hogwarts: Harry Potter slash fanfiction". Children's Literature. 36: 185–207. doi:10.1353/chl.0.0017. S2CID 143937185.
- Turnbull‐Dugarte, Stuart J.; McMillan, Fraser (August 2023). ""Protect the women!" Trans‐exclusionary feminist issue framing and support for transgender rights". Policy Studies Journal. 51 (3): 629–666. doi:10.1111/psj.12484.

=== Non-English news articles ===
- Marsick, Laurent (3 February 2023). Abelard, Agathe (ed.). "'Harry Potter': comment J.K. Rowling est-elle passée de l'ombre à la lumière?" ['Harry Potter': how did J.K. Rowling go from the shadows to the light?] (in French). RTL. Archived from the original on 15 February 2023. "Traduits en 84 langues, les 7 romans d'Harry Potter se sont écoulés à plus de 600 millions d'exemplaires dans le monde." [Translated into 84 languages, the seven Harry Potter novels have sold more than 600 million copies worldwide.]
