= List of awards and nominations received by J. K. Rowling =

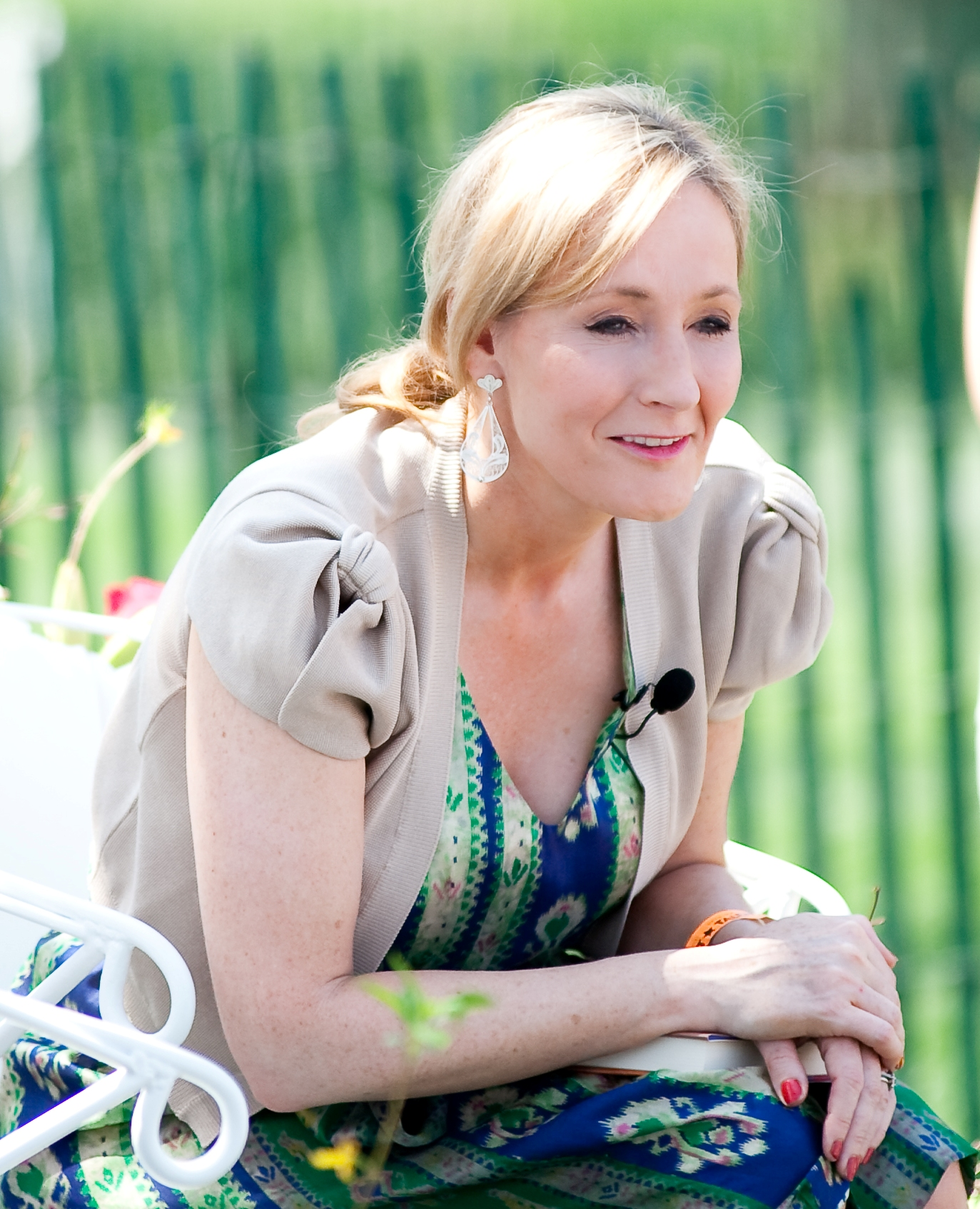
Rowling in 2010

Joanne Rowling, known by her pen name J. K. Rowling, is a British author and philanthropist. She has won numerous accolades for her Harry Potter book series, including general literature prizes, honours in children's literature and speculative fiction awards. The series has garnered multiple British Book Awards, beginning with the Children's Book of the Year in 1997 and 1998 for the first two volumes, Harry Potter and the Philosopher's Stone and Harry Potter and the Chamber of Secrets. In 2000 the third novel, Harry Potter and the Prisoner of Azkaban, was nominated for an adult award – the Whitbread Book of the Year – where it competed against a book by a Nobel Prize laureate (Seamus Heaney's translation of Beowulf). The award body gave Rowling the children's prize instead (worth half the cash amount); some scholars view this as exposing a literary prejudice against children's books. Next followed the World Science Fiction Convention's 2001 Hugo Award for the fourth book, Harry Potter and the Goblet of Fire, and the British Book Awards' adult prize – the 2006 Book of the Year – for the sixth novel, Harry Potter and the Half-Blood Prince.

Rowling's early career awards include the Order of the British Empire (OBE) for services to children's literature in 2000, and three years later, the Spanish Prince of Asturias Award for Concord. She won the British Book Awards' Author of the Year and Outstanding Achievement prizes over the span of the Harry Potter series. Following the series' completion, Time named Rowling a runner-up for its 2007 Person of the Year, citing the social, moral and political inspiration she gave the Harry Potter fandom. Two years later, she was recognised as a Chevalier de la Légion d'Honneur by French President Nicolas Sarkozy; leading magazine editors then named her the "Most Influential Woman in the UK" the following October. Later awards include the Freedom of the City of London in 2012 and for her services to literature and philanthropy, the Order of the Companions of Honour (CH) in 2017. In 2024 Rowling stated that she had been offered a life peerage by both Labour and Conservative governments, but had declined both. She has also confirmed that she declined a damehood.

Academic bodies have bestowed multiple honours on Rowling. She has received honorary degrees from the University of Aberdeen; the University of St Andrews; Dartmouth College; the University of Edinburgh; Edinburgh Napier University; the University of Exeter (which she attended) and Harvard University. Rowling spoke at Harvard's 2008 commencement ceremony; the same year, she also won University College Dublin's James Joyce Award. Her other honours include fellowship of the Royal Society of Literature (FRSL), the Royal Society of Edinburgh (HonFRSE) and the Royal College of Physicians of Edinburgh (FRCPE).

Rowling's awards for film, theatre and crime fiction include the 2011 British Academy Film Award for Outstanding British Contribution to Cinema for the Harry Potter film series, the 2017 Laurence Olivier Award for Best New Play for Harry Potter and the Cursed Child, and the 2021 British Book Awards' Crime and Thriller category for the fifth volume of her Cormoran Strike series.

== Literature ==
=== General literature ===
General literature
Award	Year	Category	Work	Result	Ref.
British Book Awards	1997	Children's Book of the Year	Harry Potter and the Philosopher's Stone	Won	
British Book Awards	1998	Children's Book of the Year	Harry Potter and the Chamber of Secrets	Won	
British Book Awards	1999	Author of the Year	J. K. Rowling	Won	
British Book Awards	2000	Children's Book of the Year	Harry Potter and the Goblet of Fire	Nominated	
British Book Awards	2004	Book of the Year	Harry Potter and the Order of the Phoenix	Nominated	
British Book Awards	2006	Book of the Year	Harry Potter and the Half-Blood Prince	Won	
British Book Awards	2008	Outstanding Achievement	J. K. Rowling	Won	
British Book Awards	2009	Children's Book of the Year	The Tales of Beedle the Bard	Nominated	
British Book Awards	2017	Children's Book of the Year	Harry Potter and the Cursed Child	Nominated	
British Book Awards	2020	30 From 30	Harry Potter and the Philosopher's Stone	Won	
British Book Awards	2021	Crime and Thriller	Troubled Blood	Won	
British Book Awards	2024	Crime and Thriller	The Running Grave	Nominated	
Carnegie Medal	1997	Carnegie Medal	Harry Potter and the Philosopher's Stone	Commended	
Carnegie Medal	1999	Carnegie Medal	Harry Potter and the Prisoner of Azkaban	Nominated	
Nestlé Smarties Book Prize	1997	Gold Medal	Harry Potter and the Philosopher's Stone	Won	
Nestlé Smarties Book Prize	1998	Gold Medal	Harry Potter and the Chamber of Secrets	Won	
Nestlé Smarties Book Prize	1999	Gold Medal	Harry Potter and the Prisoner of Azkaban	Won	
Scottish Arts Council Award	1998	Children's Book of the Year	Harry Potter and the Chamber of Secrets	Won	
Whitbread Book Awards	1999	Children's Book of the Year	Harry Potter and the Chamber of Secrets	Nominated	
Whitbread Book Awards	2000	Book of the Year	Harry Potter and the Prisoner of Azkaban	Nominated	
Whitbread Book Awards	2000	Children's Book of the Year	Harry Potter and the Prisoner of Azkaban	Won	

=== Speculative fiction ===
Speculative fiction
Award	Year	Category	Work	Result	Ref.
Bram Stoker Award	2000	Work for Young Readers	Harry Potter and the Prisoner of Azkaban	Won	
Bram Stoker Award	2001	Work for Young Readers	Harry Potter and the Goblet of Fire	Nominated	
Bram Stoker Award	2004	Work for Young Readers	Harry Potter and the Order of the Phoenix	Won	
Hugo Award	2000	Novel	Harry Potter and the Prisoner of Azkaban	Nominated	
Hugo Award	2001	Novel	Harry Potter and the Goblet of Fire	Won	
Locus Award	1999	First Novel	Harry Potter and the Philosopher's Stone	Nominated	
Locus Award	2000	Fantasy Novel	Harry Potter and the Prisoner of Azkaban	Won	
Locus Award	2019	Art Book	The Tales of Beedle the Bard	Nominated	
Mythopoeic Award	1999	Children's Literature	Harry Potter and the Philosopher's Stone	Nominated	
Mythopoeic Award	2000	Children's Literature	Harry Potter and the Prisoner of Azkaban	Nominated	
Mythopoeic Award	2008	Children's Literature	The Harry Potter Series	Won	
Nebula Award	2008	Andre Norton Award (Note: The Andre Norton Award was "not a Nebula" at the time Deathly Hallows won, but the rules were later changed to make it a Nebula Award category. The change is retroactive: SFWA now lists the book as winner of the Andre Norton Nebula Award.)	Harry Potter and the Deathly Hallows	Won	
Prometheus Award	2004	Best Novel	Harry Potter and the Order of the Phoenix	Finalist	

=== Crime fiction ===
Crime fiction
Award	Year	Work	Result	Ref.
Gold Dagger	2015	The Silkworm	Nominated	
Gold Dagger	2021	Troubled Blood	Nominated	
Ian Fleming Steel Dagger	2021	Troubled Blood	Nominated	
Theakston's Old Peculier Crime Novel of the Year	2016	Career of Evil	Nominated	

== Film and theatre ==
Film and theatre awards
Award	Year	Category	Work	Result	Ref.
British Academy Film Awards	2010	Outstanding British Contribution to Cinema	Harry Potter film series (Note: Rowling accepted the award with producer David Heyman and members of the cast and crew.)	Won	
British Academy Children's Awards	2011	Feature Film	Harry Potter and the Deathly Hallows – Part 2	Won	
Laurence Olivier Awards	2017	Best New Play	Harry Potter and the Cursed Child	Won	
Tony Awards	2018	Best Play	Harry Potter and the Cursed Child	Won	

== Career awards ==
=== State ===
State awards
Year	Country	Honour	Citation	Ref.
2000	UK	Order of the British Empire (OBE)	Services to children's literature	
2003	Spain	Prince of Asturias Award for Concord	Children's literature (Note: The award body described Rowling's work as "vínculo entre continentes y generaciones [es: a link between continents and generations]" and as promoting "la imaginación como fuente de libertad al servicio del bien y la cooperación y la solidaridad entre las personas [es: imagination as a source of freedom at the service of good and cooperation and solidarity among people]".)	
2008	UK	Edinburgh Award	Contributions to Edinburgh	
2009	France	Chevalier de la Légion d'Honneur		
2012	UK	Freedom of the City of London	Services to children's literature	
2017	UK	Order of the Companions of Honour (CH)	Services to literature and philanthropy	

=== Academic ===
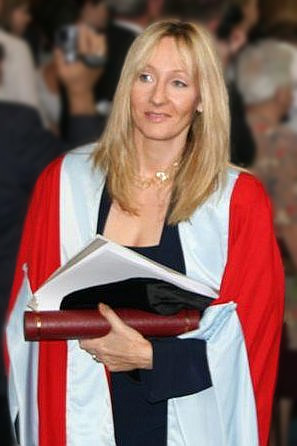
Rowling after receiving an honorary degree from the University of Aberdeen

Academic awards
Year	Institution	Honour	Ref.
2000	Dartmouth College	Honorary degree	
2000	Edinburgh Napier University	Honorary degree	
2000	University of Exeter	Honorary degree	
2000	University of St Andrews	Honorary degree	
2002	Royal Society of Edinburgh	Fellowship (HonFRSE)	
2002	Royal Society of Literature	Fellowship (FRSL)	
2004	University of Edinburgh	Honorary degree	
2006	University of Aberdeen	Honorary degree	
2008	Harvard University	Honorary degree	
2008	University College Dublin	James Joyce Award	
2017	Royal College of Physicians of Edinburgh	Fellowship (FRCPE)	

=== Popular culture ===
Popular culture awards
Year	Awarded by	Title	Result	Ref.
1999	Glamour	Woman of the Year	Won	
2007	Time	Person of the Year	Runner-up	
2007	Barbara Walters (ABC)	Most Fascinating Person of the Year	Won	
2010	National Magazine Company	Most Influential Woman in the UK	Won	
2019	Time	Woman of the Year (1998)	Won	

=== Miscellaneous ===
Miscellaneous career awards
Year	Organisation	Award	Ref.
2007	Blue Peter	Gold Blue Peter badge	
2010	Hans Christian Andersen Literature Committee	Hans Christian Andersen Literature Award	
2016	PEN America	PEN/Allen Foundation Literary Service Award	
2018	Museum of Pop Culture	Science Fiction and Fantasy Hall of Fame	
2019	Robert F. Kennedy Human Rights	Ripple of Hope Award (returned in 2020)	

== Sources ==
- Anatol, Giselle Liza, ed. (2003). Reading Harry Potter: Critical Essays. Westport, Conn.: Praeger. ISBN 978-0-313-32067-5. OCLC 50774592.
- Kirk, Connie Ann (2003). J.K. Rowling: A Biography. Westport, Connecticut: Greenwood Press. ISBN 0-313-32205-8. OCLC 49991592.
- Nel, Philip (2001). J.K. Rowling's Harry Potter Novels: A Reader's Guide. New York: Continuum. ISBN 0-8264-5232-9. OCLC 47050453.
- Pugh, Tison (2020). Harry Potter and Beyond: On J. K. Rowling's Fantasies and Other Fictions. Columbia, South Carolina: University of South Carolina Press. doi:10.2307/j.ctvs09qwv. ISBN 978-1-64336-088-1. OCLC 1142046769. S2CID 225791872.
- Smith, Sean (2002). J.K. Rowling: A Biography. London: Arrow Books. ISBN 0-09-944542-5. OCLC 51303518.
- Whited, Lana A., ed. (2002). The Ivory Tower and Harry Potter: Perspectives on a Literary Phenomenon. Columbia, Missouri: University of Missouri Press. ISBN 978-0-8262-6330-8. OCLC 56424948.
