= Harry Potter prequel =

2008 short story by J. K. Rowling

An 800-word, untitled short story, unofficially known as the Harry Potter prequel, was written by J. K. Rowling in 2008 as part of a charity auction event, for which it fetched £25,000. It was published as part of What's Your Story Postcard Collection. The story recounts an encounter with Muggle police experienced by Sirius Black and James Potter, taking place before the events of the Harry Potter series. The manuscript was stolen in 2017, and has not been located as of 2026.

== Synopsis ==
Policemen PC Anderson and Sergeant Fisher are chasing a motorbike which is breaking the speed limit into a dead-end alley. They confront the two youths riding the bike, who introduce themselves as Sirius Black and James Potter. As the policemen attempt to arrest them for speeding and riding without helmets, three men on broomsticks fly down the alley towards them. James and Sirius use their wands to lift the police car up to form a barrier, and the broomstick riders crash into it. Sirius and James then leave the frightened policemen in the alley.

Rowling concludes the story card with the words, "From the prequel I am not working on – but that was fun!"

== History ==
=== Background ===
On 11 June 2008, Waterstones held a charity event called "What's Your Story?". Thirteen authors, including Rowling, were invited to write stories on an A5 card for auction with proceeds going to English PEN and Dyslexia Action. Rowling's card was sold for £25,000 (Note: equivalent to £40,756 in 2025) to Hira Digpal, president of Tokyo-based investment-banking consulting company Red-33. The total raised from the sale of all thirteen cards was £47,150. (Note: equivalent to £76,865 in 2025)

=== Theft ===
In April 2017, the manuscript of the prequel was stolen during a burglary in Birmingham. Rowling tweeted about the incident, asking fans not to buy the work if offered it, and West Midlands Police appealed for information. The burglary victim told the BBC that the work was "priceless" and had the potential to raise money for additional good causes, if it were to be sold again legitimately. "I don't think whoever took it or stole it or who might purchase it will really understand the benefits to people out there, what it can do," he said. "If it's destroyed, or if it's lost, it's a great loss." As of October 2026, there was no reporting about the whereabouts of the manuscript.
