= Church Cottage, Tutshill =

Church Cottage
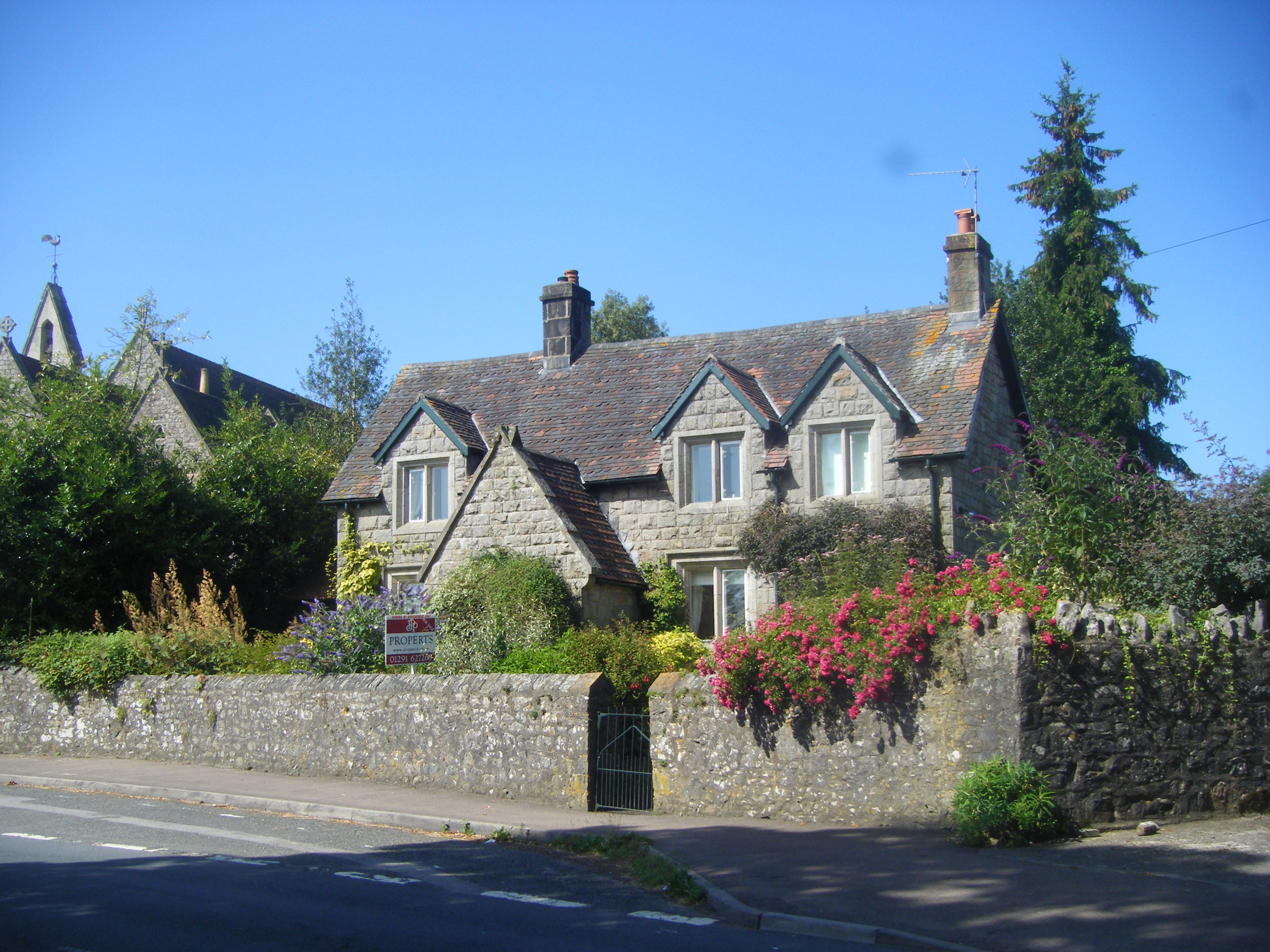

- Location in Gloucestershire
- 51.654718°N 2.665778°W
- Location: Coleford Road, Tutshill, Gloucestershire, England
- OS grid reference: ST 540 953

History
- Built: 1852

Site notes
- Architect: Henry Woodyer

Listed Building – Grade II
- Designated: 7 March 1988
- Reference no.: 1349077

Church Cottage in the village of Tutshill, Gloucestershire, England, is a Grade II listed building, thought to have been designed by the architect Henry Woodyer. It was the childhood home, between the ages of 9 and 18, of Joanne Rowling, author (as J. K. Rowling) of the Harry Potter series of fantasy books.

== Description ==
The building was constructed in about 1852 in the Victorian Gothic style, and was originally used as a schoolhouse and then a rectory. Henry Woodyer designed the adjoining St. Luke's Church, and English Heritage regard him as "possibly" the designer of the cottage as well. The 1 1/2-storey building is of sandstone, with a tiled roof, two-light chamfered mullioned casements, small gablets and a porch. In 1988 it was listed, Grade II, as being of "Special Architectural or Historic Interest" by English Heritage, who reported its external appearance as "untouched from its original design".

== J. K. Rowling ==
Joanne Rowling, together with her parents and sister, moved to the house in 1974 when she was aged nine. The house was sold by the Rowling family in 1995, and then sold again in 2011. The owner, Julian Mercer, said of the house in 2011: "J. K. Rowling would have been here in her formative years and could have taken inspiration from the cottage. The architecture is very Hogwarts-like. It has vaulted ceilings, stone windows and oozes gothic spirit." Features inside the house include an under-stairs cupboard, reportedly similar to the one in which Rowling's character Harry Potter is forced to live, and a trapdoor to a cellar. It also contains an inscription written on one window-frame, "Joanne Rowling slept here circa 1982".

Rowling also drew inspiration from the adjoining church graveyard, and the local countryside. She attended the nearby primary school in Tutshill, before moving on to Wyedean secondary school, and later named one of her fictional Quidditch teams as the "Tutshill Tornados".

=== Ownership ===
When the cottage was sold by a subsequent owner in 2012, it was reported that its new owners were associated with the Volant Charitable Trust, a charity established by Rowling to support research into multiple sclerosis and other activities. By 2020 the cottage was owned by a company run by Rowling's husband, intending to refurbish the property while retaining its original features.
