= Tutshill =

Village in Gloucestershire, England

Coordinates: 51.64829°N 2.66565°W

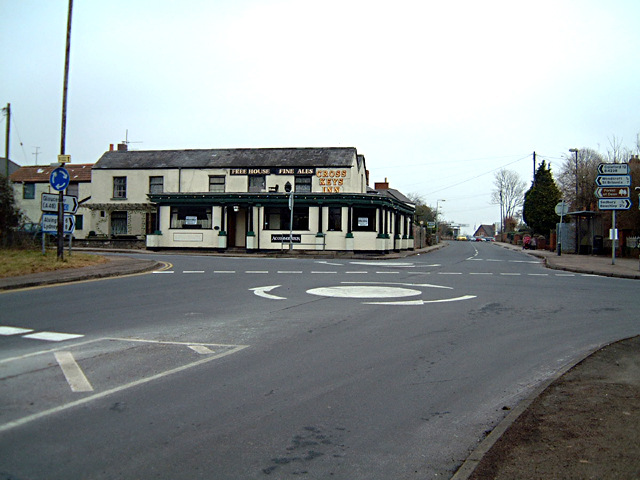
- Crossroads at Tutshill

- Location within Gloucestershire
- OS grid reference: ST539946
- District: Forest of Dean
- Shire county: Gloucestershire
- Region: South West
- Country: England
- Sovereign state: United Kingdom
- Post town: CHEPSTOW
- Postcode district: NP16
- Dialling code: 01291
- Police: Gloucestershire
- Fire: Gloucestershire
- Ambulance: South Western

Tutshill is a village within the parish of Tidenham in the Forest of Dean, Gloucestershire, England. It is located on the eastern bank of the River Wye, which forms the boundary with Monmouthshire at this point and which separates the village from the town of Chepstow. The village of Woodcroft adjoins Tutshill to the north, and across the A48 road to the south is the village of Sedbury. A short walk over the river is Chepstow railway station on the Gloucester–Newport line.

== Etymology ==
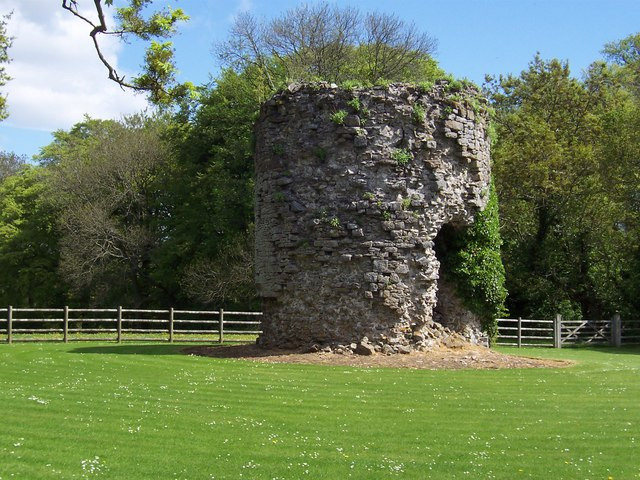
The ruined tower at Tutshill

The name Tutshill is first attested in 1635, as Tutteshill, with the spelling Tutshill first appearing in 1655. The second element of the name is agreed to have originated in the Old English word hyll ('hill'). The first element of the name could derive from a word *tōt, thought to have existed in Old English, meaning 'a look-out'. This explanation has given rise to suppositions that the place owes its name to a ruined watchtower on top of the hill overlooking the River Wye and its ancient crossing point at Castleford, also having a distant view of the River Severn and its estuary. However, the ruins are of uncertain date, and although they have been supposed to be from an Anglo-Norman watchtower linked to Chepstow Castle, they may also be from a later windmill (a windmill overlooking the Wye above Chapelhouse Wood is recorded in 1584); this windmill may have been later adapted as a folly, leading to a local tradition that the ruined mill had been a look-out tower. In any case, to explain the s of Tutshill, the word *tōt would have to have been in the genitive case, and there seems to be no parallel for the use of that word in this way. The name is therefore thought by scholars to take its first element from an Old English personal name Tōt or Tutt. Thus the name originally meant 'Tōt's hill' or 'Tutt's hill'.

== History ==
Tutshill was once common land in "Bishton tithing" to the south of Tidenham Chase. The only house near the crossroads at Tutshill before the 19th century was apparently Tutshill Farm recorded from 1655.

After the town of Chepstow developed and a bridge was built over the Wye, the main road between Gloucestershire and Monmouthshire followed the steep hill directly up the river bank between the bridge and Tutshill – now a footpath linking Chepstow to the Offa's Dyke Path – until a new road looping around Castleford Hill was opened in 1808. This road carried traffic between the two counties until a new bridge was built at Chepstow in 1988, whereupon Tutshill was bypassed.

The expansion of Tutshill had begun by 1828 when building-plots north-east of the crossroads were sold, and by 1843 there were houses extending along the roads to the north and east with the Cross Keys Inn at the corner. By 1856 Tutshill was already a minor centre with two public-houses, a shop, a post office, a solicitor's office, and a private school. By this time the growing population of the Tutshill and Woodcroft area of the parish was recognized by the building of a church and a school on the road between the two hamlets. The church, dedicated to St. Luke, is a Gothic stone building comprising a nave with a bellcot at the south-eastern corner, a chancel, and a north aisle added in 1872. There was another period of expansion in the late 19th century and early years of the 20th, and there was a major increase in the population in the middle years of the 20th century when new housing-estates were built.

There was a railway station, Tutshill Halt, near Tutshill which was closed in 1959. Today many of the residents commute to nearby cities such as Bristol, Bath, Cardiff or Gloucester.

== Schools ==
Tutshill Church of England Primary School is located in the village and caters for children from the ages of 4 to 11.

In addition, Dean Close St. John's is an independent co-educational day and boarding preparatory school with all-year round day nurseries and a "pre-prep" for children under the age of eight. Founded in 1923, the school is situated in grounds overlooking Chepstow Castle.

== J. K. Rowling ==
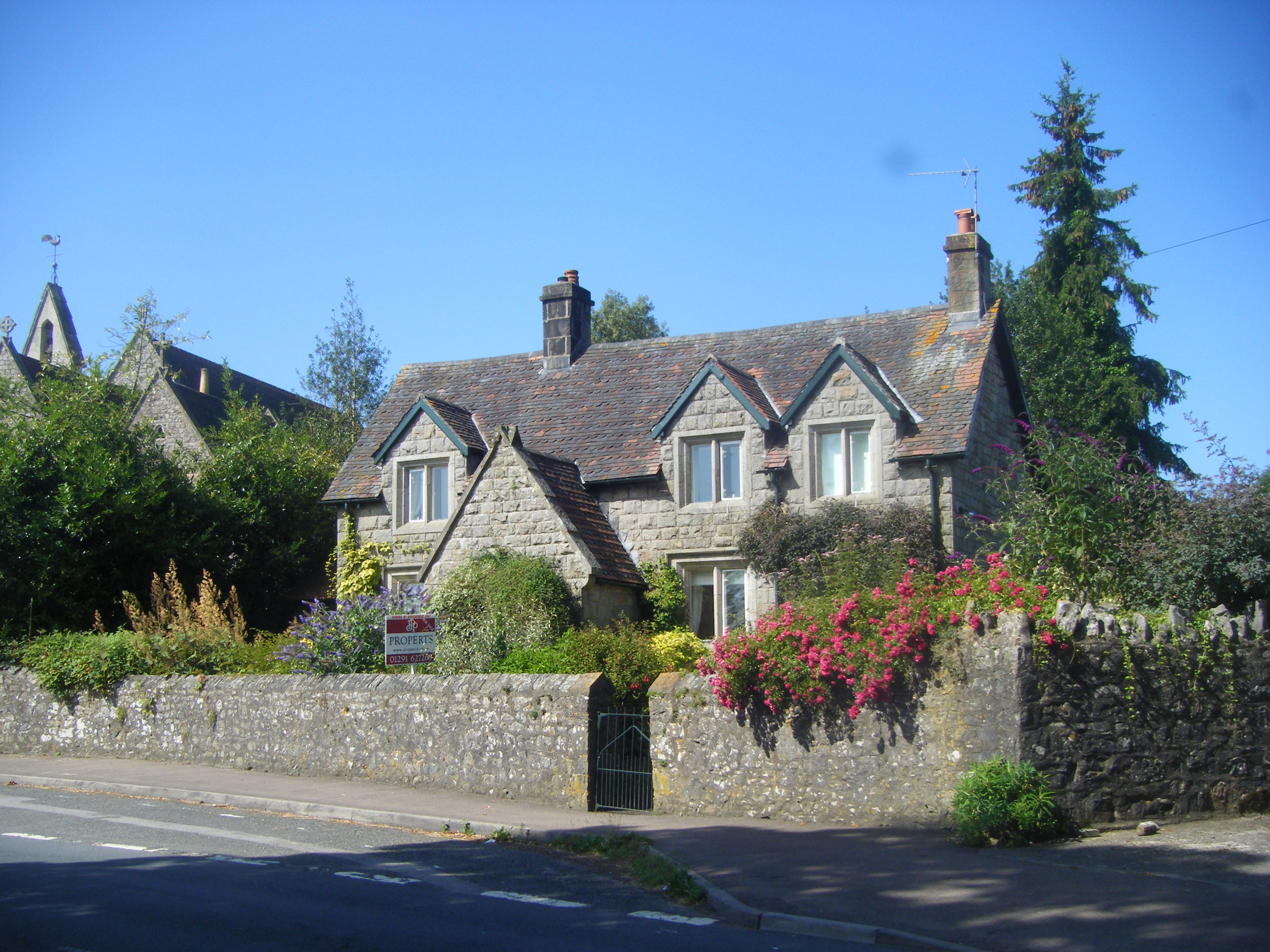
Church Cottage

The village was the childhood home, from the age of nine in 1974, of the author J. K. Rowling. She attended Tutshill Church of England Primary School before moving on at the age of eleven to the nearby Wyedean School in Sedbury. Her childhood home, Church Cottage, a mid-19th century Gothic-style Grade II listed building designed by the architect Henry Woodyer, was put up for sale in 2011.

The character Severus Snape in the Harry Potter books was partly based on Sylvia Morgan, a teacher at her primary school, and on one of her teachers at Wyedean School, John Nettleship. In the book Harry Potter and the Deathly Hallows, a passage is set in the Forest of Dean, where Harry, Hermione and Ron are camping and discover the Sword of Gryffindor where it has been hidden by Snape. Tutshill is also the home of a fictional professional Quidditch team operating within the Harry Potter universe. The Tutshill Tornados are one of thirteen fictional Quidditch teams that play in the professional Quidditch League of Britain and Ireland that was established in 1674.
