= Children's Literature in Education =

- Discipline: Children's literature
- Language: English
- Edited by: Rhonda Brock-Servais, Catherine Butler, and Victoria de Rijke

Publication details
- Publisher: Springer Science+Business Media

Standard abbreviations
- ISO 4: Child. Lit. Educ.

Indexing
- ISSN: 0045-6713 (print); 1573-1693 (web)

Links
- Journal homepage

Children's Literature in Education is an academic journal about children's literature.

Children's Literature in Education was founded in 1970. It emerged from a series of conferences on children's literature held at the University of Exeter from 1969 to 1973, particularly a 1969 conference at St Luke's Campus titled "Recent Children's Fiction and Its Role in Education". Early issues reprinted papers given at the Exeter conferences.

As of 2020, the journal was published by Springer Science+Business Media.

== Indexing ==
Children's Literature in Education is indexed in:

- Academic Search Premier
- EBSCO databases
- Modern Language Association Database
- Scopus
