= Tison Pugh =

Literary scholar

Tison Pugh is a literary scholar. He has been a professor of English at the University of Central Florida (UCF) since 2006. Before coming to UCF, Pugh was a lecturer at the University of California, Irvine, in the 2000–2001 academic year.

In 2019, Pugh was named a Pegasus Professor at UCF, which the university describes as its "highest academic award".

== Publications ==
- Queering Medieval Genres (2004)
- Sexuality and Its Queer Discontents in Middle English Literature (2008)
- Innocence, Heterosexuality, and the Queerness of Children's Literature (2011)
- An Introduction to Geoffrey Chaucer (2013)
- Chaucer's (Anti-) Eroticisms and the Queer Middle Ages (2014)
- Precious Perversions: Humor, Homosexuality, and the Southern Literary Canon (2016)
- Jews in Medieval England: Teaching Representations of the Other (edited with Miriamne Krummel, 2017)
- Harry Potter and Beyond: On J. K. Rowling’s Fantasies and Other Fictions (2020)
- Understanding Agatha Christie (2021)
- Will & Grace (2023) TV Milestones series
- Queer Oz: L. Frank Baum's Trans Tales and Other Astounding Adventures in Sex and Gender (2023)
- Bad Chaucer: The Great Poet's Greatest Mistakes (2024)
