= Miriamne Krummel =

American professor of English

Miriamne Ara Krummel is an American professor of English at the University of Dayton, and a scholar of Jewish studies. She is a graduate of the University of Connecticut and has a master's degree from Hunter College and Ph.D. from Lehigh University. Her 2002 dissertation was Fables, Facts, and Fictions: Jewishness in the English Middle Ages, directed by Patricia Clare Ingham.

Her books include Crafting Jewishness in Medieval England: Legally Absent, Virtually Present (Palgrave Macmillan, 2011), Jews in Medieval England: Teaching Representations of the Other (edited with Tison Pugh, Palgrave Macmillan, 2017), which won the 2019 Idaho State University Teaching Literature Book Award, and The Medieval Postcolonial Jew, in and Out of Time (University of Michigan Press, 2022).
