= Children's Fantasy Literature: An Introduction =

2016 book by Michael Levy / Farah Mendlesohn

- First edition cover
- Author: Michael Levy, Farah Mendlesohn
- Language: English
- Subject: Children's fantasy literature
- Publisher: Cambridge University Press
- Publication date: April 2016
- Publication place: United Kingdom
- Media type: Print, digital
- Awards: 2017 World Fantasy Award for Professional Work, 2018 Mythopoeic Scholarship Award
- ISBN: 978-1-107-01814-3

Children's Fantasy Literature: An Introduction is a reference work by American author Michael Levy and British author Farah Mendlesohn, published in 2016 by Cambridge University Press. It follows the history of fantasy read by children over a period of 500 years. Events covered in the book include the collection of folk tales in the 16th century, the impact of world wars on British fantasy and the American response, and the emergence of modern children's and young adult fantasy.

The book was well-received by critics, who praised how it traced the evolution of the genre in response to real-world events. A children's literature journal termed it a "foundational text", stating that it was the first in-depth study of children's fantasy. The Times Literary Supplement called it "magisterial" but criticized the presentation of the large number of works discussed, while another critic found it stimulating. Children's Fantasy Literature won the 2017 World Fantasy Award for Professional Work and the 2018 Mythopoeic Scholarship Award.

== Background ==
Michael Levy and Farah Mendlesohn are best known for their scholarly work on speculative fiction. Mendlesohn's most highly cited work is the 2008 book Rhetorics of Fantasy, which proposes a four-part taxonomy of the fantasy genre. Both authors have also been described as prominent scholars in children's literature criticism, with Levy affiliated with the Children's Literature Association. This book was the last work by Levy, who died a year after its publication.

Children's Fantasy Literature focuses on a blend of two genres, using a broad definition of terms. It defines children's literature as "fiction read to or by children, whether or not it was originally published for children and whether or not adults have approved of children reading it", and fantasy as "the realization of the impossible". The age at which such fiction has been aimed is not fixed; the authors state that it gradually grew over time. Thus their first chapter on the 16th century features 8-year-old protagonists, while their concluding section on modern fantasy features characters in their late teens.

== Synopsis ==
The book begins with a chapter on folk tales, which were not originally children's fantasy due to fears that their minds "might be damaged by the dark and the fantastic". Next is a section on the British stories of "fairies, ghouls and goblins" in the Edwardian and Victorian eras, marking a transition where a children's literature market was established. Works discussed include Alice in Wonderland by Lewis Carroll and The Magic City by Edith Nesbit. This is followed by a chapter on early American tales, including the Gothic stories of Nathaniel Hawthorne and Frank L. Baum's The Wonderful Wizard of Oz.

The authors then trace British children's fantasy between the two world wars, studying novelists such as Enid Blyton, T. H. White and J. R. R. Tolkien (limited to the latter's The Hobbit). Next, they identify a drastic shift in the genre in the aftermath of the Second World War. They see the demands of war on children reflected in the rising stakes and manifestations of evil in fantasy, such as in the works of Susan Cooper, Alan Garner, and most prominently in The Chronicles of Narnia by C. S. Lewis, which, in the authors' view, "came to define what children’s fantasy was". They also identify an "encouragement of Englishness" in post-war UK fantasy, including tales based on the legend of King Arthur, and discuss it in context with indigenous myth and folklore in Australian and Canadian fantasy.

The book next focuses on the impact of Tolkien's Middle-earth on children's fantasy, discussing the distinct subgenres that emerged as a response. A chapter is devoted to American authors of the 1970s and 1980s, including Ursula K. Le Guin, Robin McKinley and Jane Yolen, who wrote mythopoeic fantasies set in a secondary world. A different strain of British urban fantasy also developed, prominently in the works of Diana Wynne Jones; the authors state that Jones, along with Lewis, are the two novelists most frequently discussed in the book. They also detail a decline in children's fantasy in the late 1980s amidst a rise in grim, violent themes, owing to a "demand for social realism".

Next follows a chapter on the 1990s fantasy revival due to the success of J. K. Rowling's Harry Potter. Stating that it made fantasy a dominant genre in children's literature, the book discusses how it revived some older authors' careers, and studies the many imitators and subversions Harry Potter spawned. Noting social changes in 1990s adolescent life, the concluding chapter focuses on the emergence of a new young adult fantasy market. It identifies two trends therein, the first being paranormal fiction. The second trend is credited to the success of Philip Pullman's His Dark Materials, resulting in a subgenre that the authors term "the fantasy of bitterness and loss". They suggest that it contains "the finest fantasy for any age group currently being written".

== Reception ==
A review in The Times Literary Supplement found the book "magisterial". The children's literature journal The Lion and the Unicorn called it a "foundational text", stating that it was the first book to "put the study of children's literature and the study of the fantastic in extended dialogue". Critics noted that the two genres are usually discussed separately, and that the authors' background in both areas aided their study. Remarking on the large span of time considered (the sixteenth to twenty-first centuries), the Children's Literature Association Quarterly predicted that it would be "the unsurpassed reference for the field for years to come".

The book's historical narrative has been a subject of discussion. The Spectator's Daniel Hahn commended its tracing of the genre through world wars; he found the argument of a distinct post-war literature, where the child protagonists of fantasy start facing greater evil, particularly convincing. He described its historical aspects as conveying a "satisfying sense of—albeit partly illusory—coherence to this broad and fascinating story". Critics have also remarked on the book's nuanced treatment of emergence of the young adult genre. The blending of the historical theme with the smaller-scale discussion of each text was praised by Charlotte Jones of The Times Literary Supplement, who regarded the book's narrative as "an astonishing balancing act".

Reviewers have noted the book's sizeable bibliography. English scholar Anelise Farris wrote that it discussed both well-known and underread works in subgenres ranging from urban fantasy to the Gothic tradition, features that distinguished it from prior studies of the field. Jones was less positive and criticized the book's "arduous dependence on listing and paraphrase". Scholar Amanda M. Greenwell suggested that there was a tradeoff: while some readers might be overwhelmed by the large quantity of novels listed, others would instead find it stimulating. She stated that she had already used it to assemble a reading list.

The authors' apparent fondness for the books they comment on has also been observed. Jones found their zest infectious, particularly in the post-war period, "the golden age" of children's fantasy, while Hahn saw the book as a reminder that "expertly crafted fantasy is unnervingly hard to resist". In a similar viewpoint, Farris stated that the book's greatest strength was its ability to convey "a sense of the necessity of children's literature".

For Children's Fantasy Literature, Levy and Mendlesohn received the 2017 World Fantasy Award for Professional Work and the 2018 Mythopoeic Scholarship Award. The latter was a posthumous award for Levy, who had died in 2017, and was accepted by his wife, Sandra Lindow.

== Sources ==
- Levy, Michael; Mendlesohn, Farah (2016). Children's Fantasy Literature: An Introduction. Cambridge University Press. ISBN 978-1-107-01814-3.
- Farris, Anelise (2016). "[Review:] Levy, Michael, and Farah Mendlesohn. Children's Fantasy Literature: An Introduction". Journal of the Fantastic in the Arts. 23 (3): 522–525. JSTOR 26321156.
- Greenwell, Amanda M. (2017). "[Review:] Michael Levy and Farah Mendlesohn. Children's Fantasy Literature: An Introduction". The Lion and the Unicorn. 41 (3): 404–406. doi:10.1353/uni.2017.0034. S2CID 148802842.
- Hixon, Martha P. (2018). "[Review:] Children's Fantasy Literature: An Introduction by Michael Levy and Farah Mendlesohn". Children's Literature. 46: 246–253. doi:10.1353/chl.2018.0019.
- McClelland, Joli Barham (2016). "[Review:] Children's Fantasy Literature: An Introduction by Michael Levy and Farah Mendlesohn". Children's Literature Association Quarterly. 41 (4): 458–460. doi:10.1353/chq.2016.0053.
