= The Giving Tree =

Children's picture book by Shel Silverstein

- The cover, depicting The Giving Tree offering an apple to the Boy
- Author: Shel Silverstein
- Illustrator: Silverstein
- Genre: Children's picture book
- Publisher: Harper & Row
- Publication date: October 7, 1964
- Pages: 64
- ISBN: 978-0-06-025665-4
- Followed by: Who Wants a Cheap Rhinoceros?

The Giving Tree is an American children's picture book written and illustrated by Shel Silverstein. First published in 1964 by Harper & Row, it has become one of Silverstein's best-known titles, and has been translated into numerous languages. The book focuses on an apple tree and a boy, the latter of whom ages throughout the story. During each stage of his life, the boy asks the tree for something and in response, the tree gives more of herself away to him. At the end of each scene, she is usually happy.

The Giving Tree has been described as "one of the most divisive books in children's literature" by librarian Elizabeth Bird; the controversy stems from whether the relationship between the main characters (a boy and the eponymous tree) should be interpreted as positive (i.e., the tree gives the boy selfless love) or negative (i.e., the boy and the tree have an abusive relationship). The book's back cover, which featured a photograph of Silverstein, also received negative attention, with some people perceiving it as scary.

== Background ==
Shel Silverstein had difficulty finding a publisher for The Giving Tree. An editor at Simon & Schuster rejected the book's manuscript because he felt that it was "too sad" for children and "too simple" for adults. Tomi Ungerer encouraged Silverstein to approach Ursula Nordstrom, who was a publisher with Harper & Row.

An editor with Harper & Row stated that Silverstein had made the original illustrations "scratchy" like his cartoons for Playboy, but that he later reworked the art in a "more pared-down and much sweeter style". The final black-and-white drawings have been described as "unadorned [...] visual minimalism". Harper & Row published a small first edition of the book, consisting of 5,000–7,500 copies, in 1964.

== Plot ==
The book follows the lives of an apple tree and a boy, who develop a relationship with each other. The tree is very "giving" and the boy ages into a "taking" teenager, a young man, a middle-aged man, and finally an elderly man. Despite the fact that the boy ages in the story, the tree addresses him as "Boy" throughout his entire life.

In his childhood, the boy enjoys playing with the tree, climbing her trunk, swinging from her branches, carving "Me + T (Tree)" into the bark, and eating her apples. However, as the boy grows older, he spends less time with the tree and tends to visit her only when he wants material items at various stages of his life, or not coming to the tree alone [such as bringing his girlfriend to the tree and carving "Me +Y.L." (her initials, often assumed to be an initialism for "young love") into the tree]. In an effort to make the boy happy at each of these stages, the tree gives him parts of herself, which he can transform into material items, such as money from her apples when the boy is a teenager, or a house from her branches when the boy is a young man, and with every stage of giving, "the Tree was happy". However, when the boy is a middle-aged man and asks to chop the tree to make himself a boat, which the tree allows, "the Tree was happy... but not really".

In the final pages, both the tree and the boy feel the consequences of their respective "giving" and "taking" nature. When only a stump remains for the tree, the boy returns as a tired elderly man to meet the tree once more. She mentions she cannot provide him shade, apples, or any materials like in the past. The man tells her that all he wants is "a quiet place to sit and rest", which the tree, who is weak being just a stump, could provide. With this final stage of giving, "the Tree was happy".

== Reception ==
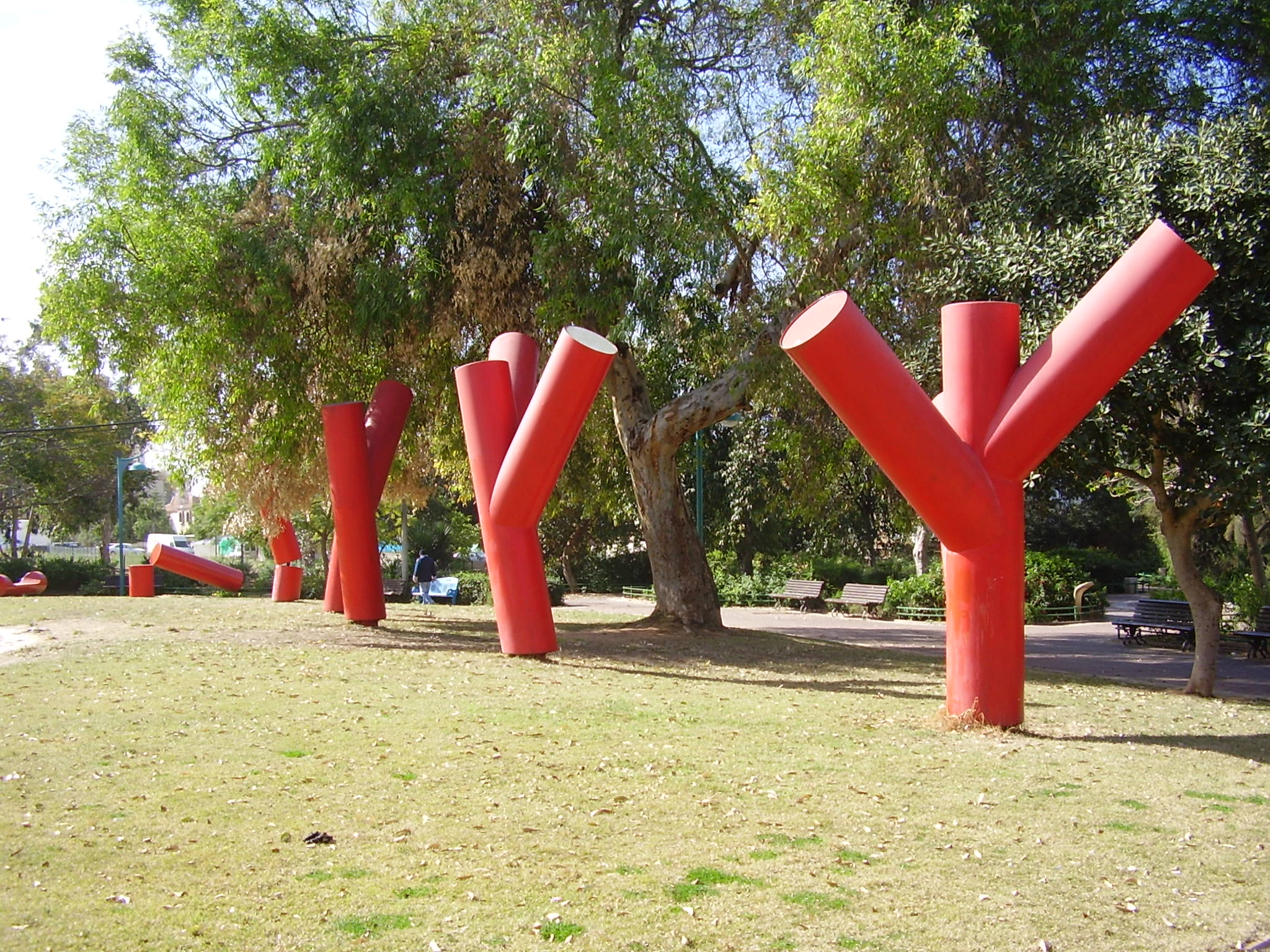
The Giving Tree Garden, Holon, Israel

Interest in the book increased by word of mouth; for example, in churches "it was hailed as a parable on the joys of giving". As of 2001, over 5 million copies of the book had been sold, placing it 14th on a list of hardcover "All-Time Bestselling Children's Books" from Publishers Weekly. By 2011, 8.5 million copies of the book had been sold.

In a 1999–2000, National Education Association online survey of children, the book was ranked 24th among the "Kids' Top 100 Books". In the 2007 online "Teachers' Top 100 Books for Children" poll by the National Education Association, the book came in third. It was 85th of the "Top 100 Picture Books" of all time in a 2012 poll by School Library Journal. Scholastic Parent & Child magazine placed it #9 on its list of "100 Greatest Books for Kids" in 2012.

== Interpretations ==
The book prompted a diverse scope of interpretations from several critics. Some have interpreted the tree as Mother Nature and the boy as humanity. The book has been used to teach children environmental ethics, and an educational resource for children described the book as an "allegory about the responsibilities a human being has for living organisms in the environment". Ursula Nordstrom attributed the book's success partially to "Protestant ministers and Sunday-school teachers", believing that the tree represents "the Christian ideal of unconditional love". On the other hand, Lisa Rowe Fraustino stated that the book is sometimes treated as a "what-not-to-do role model". Some authors believe that the book is not actually intended for children, but instead should be treated as a satire aimed at adults, along the lines of A Modest Proposal by Jonathan Swift.

=== Friendship interpretations ===
One writer believes that the relationship between the boy and the tree is one of friendship. As such, the book teaches children "as your life becomes polluted with the trappings of the modern world—as you 'grow up'—your relationships tend to suffer if you let them fall to the wayside". Another writer's criticism of this interpretation is that the tree appears to be an adult when the boy is young, and cross-generational friendships are rare. Additionally, this relationship can be seen from a humanities perspective, emphasizing the need for helping each other.

=== Mother–child interpretations ===
A common interpretation of the book is that the tree and the boy have a mother–son relationship, as in a 1995 collection of essays about the book edited by Richard John Neuhaus in the journal First Things. Among the essayists, some were positive about the relationship; for example, Amy A. Kass wrote about the story that "it is wise and it is true about giving and about motherhood", and her husband Leon R. Kass encourages people to read the book because the tree "is an emblem of the sacred memory of our own mother's love". Other essayists put forth negative views. Mary Ann Glendon wrote that the book is "a nursery tale for the 'me' generation, a primer of narcissism, a catechism of exploitation", and Jean Bethke Elshtain felt that the story ends with the tree and the boy "both wrecks". A 1998 study using phenomenographic methods found that Swedish children and mothers tended to interpret the book as dealing with friendship, while Japanese mothers tended to interpret the book as dealing with parent–child relationships.

== Criticism ==
Criticism of The Giving Tree revolves around how the relationship between the boy and the tree is depicted. Elizabeth Bird, writing for the School Library Journal, described The Giving Tree as "one of the most divisive books in children's literature", while American writer and academic Ellen Handler Spitz referred to the book as "overrated".

Winter Prosapio said that the boy never thanks the tree for its gifts. In an interview with Horn Book Magazine, Phyllis J. Fogelman, an editor with Harper & Row, said the book is "about a sadomasochistic relationship", which mirrors Mary Daly's analysis in Gyn/Ecology: the Metaethics of Radical Feminism.

One college instructor discovered that the book caused both male and female remedial reading students to be angry because they felt that the boy exploited the tree. For teaching purposes, he paired the book with a short story by Andre Dubus entitled "The Fat Girl" because its plot can be described as the opposite of The Giving Tree's.

Ruth Margalit further relayed the damaging message that mothers sometimes have by receiving The Giving Tree as a gift; she quotes children's book author Laurel Snyder who said, "it does send a message to the mother that we are supposed to be this person."

In 2020, playwright Topher Payne released an alternate ending for the book, which he called The Tree Who Set Healthy Boundaries, with art in the style of the original. In Payne's version, after the boy requests that the tree give him her branches so that he can make a house, the tree explains that "proper boundaries must be established for a healthy relationship." The boy and the tree remain friends, and eventually go into business together, with the boy selling apple pies made from the tree's fruit. Payne subsequently explained that he had found The Giving Tree problematic ever since reading it as a child, since he found the boy as a character to be "unlikeable".

=== Author's photograph ===
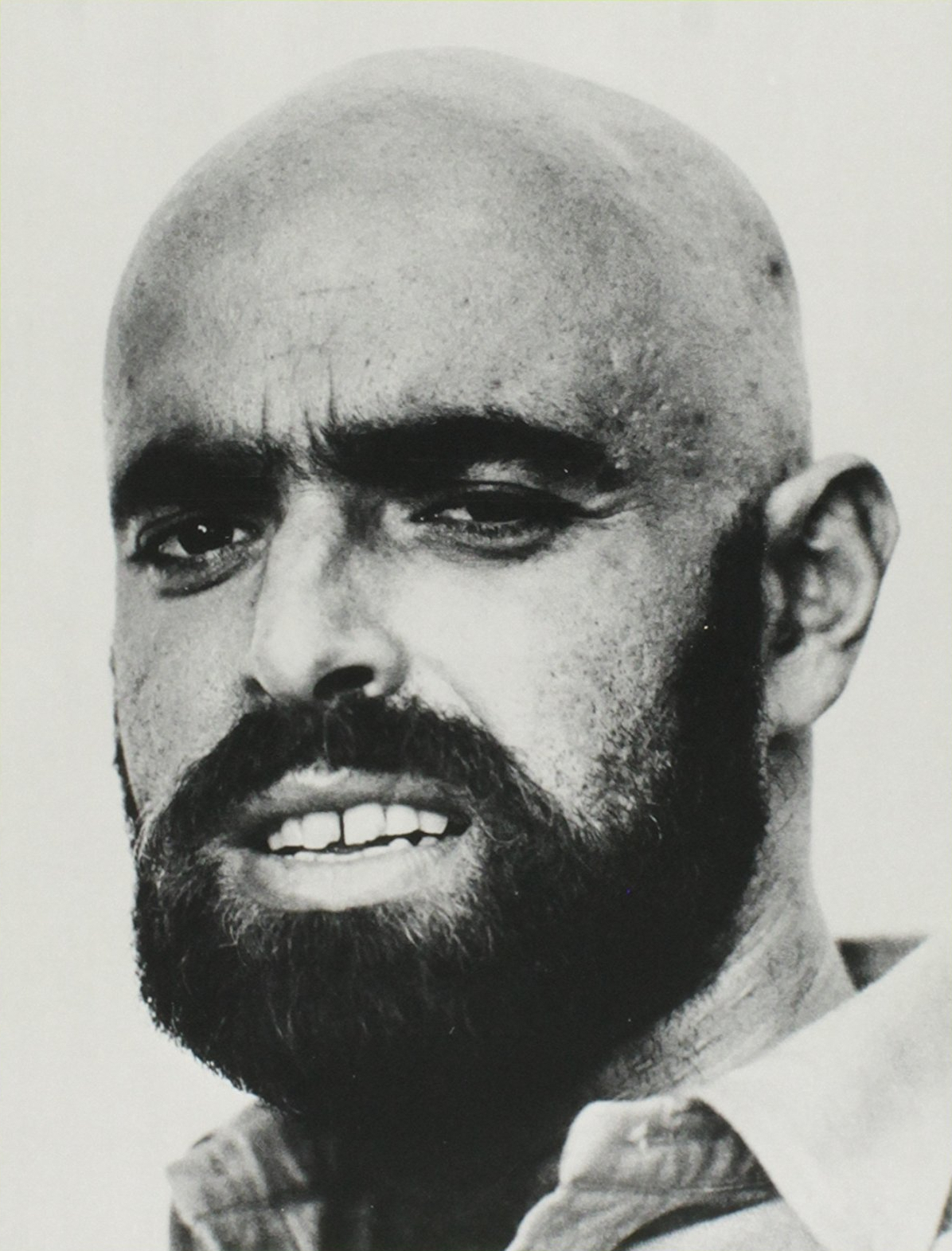
Photograph of Silverstein that is used on the back cover of the book

The photograph of Silverstein on the back cover of the book has attracted negative attention, with some people finding it frightening. This photograph and the attention it received was touched upon in the children's novel Diary of a Wimpy Kid: The Last Straw by author Jeff Kinney. Protagonist Greg Heffley states that the photograph of Silverstein on the back cover of The Giving Tree terrified him as a child, and that his father would exploit this fear, saying to his son that if he got out of bed at night, he would "probably run into Shel Silverstein in the hallway".

== Cultural influences and adaptations ==
=== Other versions ===
Various adaptations and versions of The Giving Tree have been made throughout the years, some of which were created by Silverstein. A short animated film of the book, produced in 1973, featured Silverstein's narration, and he also wrote a song of the same name, which was performed by Bobby Bare and his family on his album Singin' in the Kitchen (1974). Silverstein created an adult version of the story in a cartoon entitled "I Accept the Challenge". In the cartoon, a nude woman cuts off a nude man's arms and legs with scissors, then sits on his torso in a pose similar to the final drawing in The Giving Tree in which the old man sits on the stump.

University of Illinois Springfield professor Jacqueline Jackson and Carol Dell wrote an "alternative version" of the story for teaching purposes that was entitled "The Other Giving Tree" (1979). It featured two trees next to each other and a boy growing up. One tree acted like the original giving tree and ended up as a stump, while the other tree stopped at giving the boy apples. At the end of the story, the stump was sad that the old man chose to sit under the shade of the other tree.

In 2010, two parodies were published by different authors, The Taking Tree and The Taking Tree: A Selfish Parody, that use comedy to change the story and its message. And later, writer Topher Payne came up with an alternate ending by modifying the second half of the book, calling it "The Tree Who Set Healthy Boundaries".

=== Cultural influences ===
The Giving Tree Band took its name from the book. Plain White T's EP Should've Gone to Bed has a song "The Giving Tree", written by Tim Lopez. The 2010 short film I'm Here, written and directed by Spike Jonze, is based on The Giving Tree; the main character Sheldon is named after Shel Silverstein. God of War Ragnarök director Eric Williams compared Sindri to The Giving Tree, as Sindri would constantly help in providing new and useful items for Kratos and Atreus without really getting anything back in return, until finally he had nothing left following Brok's death, similar to when the tree was reduced to nothing but a stump. Actor Ryan Gosling has a tattoo showcasing an illustration from the book.

== See also ==
- Children's literature criticism

== Bibliography ==
- Cole, William (September 9, 1973). "About Alice, a Rabbit, a Tree...". The New York Times.

Daly, Mary (1990). Gyn/Ecology: the Metaethics of Radical Feminism. Boston: Beacon Press. ISBN 0807014133. "Here is a model for masochism for female readers of all ages, and of sadism for boys of all ages...The saccharine sweet story of a little boy who 'loves' a tree—a young Apollo who crowns himself with her leaves—has 'healthier' appeal than overt S and M biblical tales of a dead godman crowned with thorns."

- Fredericks, Anthony D. (1997). "26. The Giving Tree". The Librarian's Complete Guide to Involving Parents Through Children's Literature Grades K-6. Englewood, CO: Libraries Unlimited. ISBN 1563085380.
- Kinney, Jeff (January 2009). Diary of a Wimpy Kid: The Last Straw. Amulet Books. ISBN 9780810988927.
- Natov, Roni & DeLuca, Geraldine (1979). "Discovering Contemporary Classics: an Interview with Ursula Nordstrom". The Lion and the Unicorn. 3 (1). doi:10.1353/uni.0.0355. S2CID 146597466.
- Spitz, Ellen Handler (1999). Inside Picture Books. New Haven, CT: Yale University Press. ISBN 0300076029.
- Strandburg, Walter L. & Livo, Norma J. (1986). "The Giving Tree or There is a Sucker Born Every Minute". Children's Literature in Education. 17 (1). doi:10.1007/BF01126946. S2CID 143366143.
