= Michael M. Levy =

American writer, critic and academic

- Born: April 15, 1950; Chicago, Illinois, U.S.
- Died: April 4, 2017 (aged 66); Menomonie, Wisconsin, U.S.
- Occupations: Writer, critic, academic
- Spouse: Sandra J. Lindow
- Children: 2
- Writing career
- Notable work: Children's Fantasy Literature: An Introduction (2016)
- Notable awards: World Fantasy Award for Professional Work
- Title: Professor of English and philosophy

Academic background
- Education: University of Illinois (BA); Ohio State University (MA); University of Minnesota (PhD)

Academic work
- Institutions: University of Wisconsin–Stout

Michael Marc Levy (April 15, 1950 – April 4, 2017) was an American writer, critic and professor of English and philosophy at the University of Wisconsin–Stout. He was known for his scholarly contributions to speculative fiction and children's literature, and for his book reviews in a variety of literary magazines and journals. His work as author includes chapters in the Cambridge Companion and Routledge Companion to science fiction. Levy also wrote Children's Fantasy Literature: An Introduction, the first work on the 500-year history of the genre, in collaboration with Farah Mendlesohn.

In 2017, the University of Wisconsin–Stout named its children's literature library after Levy. His other honors include a World Fantasy Award, a Mythopoeic Award and the Clareson award for contributions to science fiction scholarship.

== Life and career ==
Levy was born in Chicago, Illinois in 1950. He received his BA from the University of Illinois in 1972, his MA from the Ohio State University in 1974, and his PhD from the University of Minnesota in 1982, and began his academic career at the University of Wisconsin–Stout in 1980. He was a professor in the department of English and philosophy at the university, and later served as its chair. Over his career, Levy was associated with several science fiction and fantasy organizations: he was editor of the journal Extrapolation, and served as president of the International Association for the Fantastic in the Arts and the Science Fiction Research Association. He was also affiliated with the Children's Literature Association.

In addition to his academic career, Levy was engaged in activities as critic and author. He reviewed books for magazines such as Publishers Weekly and the New York Review of Science Fiction, writing more than a hundred reviews for the latter over his career. As author, he contributed chapters to non-fiction books such as the 2002 Cambridge Companion to Science Fiction and the 2009 Routledge Companion to Science Fiction. Levy's last book prior to his death was the 2016 Children's Fantasy Literature: An Introduction, co-written with Farah Mendlesohn. It was the first book on the 500-year history of the children's fantasy genre and was termed a foundational work by critics.

Levy died of cancer in 2017. A posthumous publication co-edited with Farah Mendlesohn, Aliens in Popular Culture, appeared in 2019. The book collects over a hundred essays on aliens from science fiction authors and scholars, and includes a chapter by Levy, "Aliens in Video Games".

== Recognition ==
Levy won the 2007 Clareson award for his contributions to science fiction and fantasy scholarship. For his 2016 book Children's Fantasy Literature: An Introduction, he received the World Fantasy Award for Professional Work and the Mythopoeic Scholarship Award. In 2017, the children's literature library of the University of Wisconsin–Stout was named after Levy.
