= Rhetorics of Fantasy =

2008 book by Farah Mendlesohn

- Author: Farah Mendlesohn
- Subject: Fantasy genre, literary theory
- Publisher: Wesleyan University Press
- Publication date: 2008 (first edition)
- ISBN: 9-7-808-1956868-7

Rhetorics of Fantasy is a non-fiction book by the British academic Farah Mendlesohn. It was published in April 2008 by Wesleyan University Press. In the book, Mendlesohn proposes four categories of fantasy literature: portal quest, immersive, intrusion, and liminal. The discussion for each category includes about twenty novels.

The book was a significant contribution to literary studies, particularly with regard to fantasy and genre fiction. It changed the focus of fantasy scholarship from debates over narrative material to exploring content structurally – considering the reader's experience and expectations alongside those of the protagonist.

Rhetorics of Fantasy won the British Science Fiction Association's 2008 award for Best Non-Fiction in 2008.

== Contents ==
HEALTH WARNING:

This book is not intended to create rules.

Its categories are not intended to fix anything in stone.

This book is merely a portal to fantasy, a tour around the skeletons and exoskeletons of genre.

— Farah Mendlesohn, Rhetorics of Fantasy

Rhetorics of Fantasy is literary criticism incorporating thought from rhetorics, narratology, and semiotics. Mendlesohn's work centres on a reader's experience, rather than assigning thematic or historical groupings to works. The scholarly writing is descriptive, not prescriptive – i.e., Mendlesohn observes how things are and not what they must be. A key assertion by Mendlesohn is this: fantasy novels are more effective when the conventions used are appropriate to the reader's expectations for a given category.

Rhetorics of Fantasy outlines four categories for the fantasy genre: portal-quest, immersive, intrusion, and liminal. Mendlesohn analyses, through close reading, about twenty novels per section. Each of the four rhetorical modes has associated stylistic and narrative techniques. Mendlesohn contends, for example, that a work of immersive fantasy using the style of portal fantasy will feel "leaden".

=== Portal-quest ===
In portal-quest fantasy, the protagonist enters an Otherworld that is unexplained to the character and to the reader. Character and reader experience the world alongside one another, learning from a guide. The novel's language prevents the reader from establishing strong opinions about the narrative other than what has been presented to them. The narrator's thoughts about the world become part of the reader's knowledge base—Mendlesohn calls this reverie.

Mendlesohn contends that most portal quests are also quest fantasies. The author argues that there is so much narrativistic and stylistic overlap between both that they are equivalent in practice. An example of this equivalence is The Lion, the Witch and the Wardrobe (1950) by C. S. Lewis.

Mendlesohn explores the equivalence of portal-quest fantasy by discussing the novel The Lord of the Rings (1954–1955) by J. R. R. Tolkien. Mendlesohn identifies the hobbits' departure from the Shire, leaving everyday reality behind, as the portal constituent; the quest is to destroy power.

=== Immersive fantasy ===
In immersive fantasy, the reader is treated as though they are from the fictional world. In works of immersive fantasy, the fantastic is typical for both protagonist and reader. There is no attempt by the author to construct wonder; readers construct the wondrous world by encountering it. Such works have worlds characterised by entrancing detail.

Examples of immersive fantasy include Wicked: The Life and Times of the Wicked Witch of the West by Gregory Maguire. In science fiction, the fantastic becomes coherent scientific cohesion, which classically denies the sense of wonder. Mendlesohn points to China Miéville's novel Perdido Street Station (2000) in this regard.

=== Intrusion fantasy ===
In intrusion fantasy, the fantastic brings chaos, which need not be negative. Usually, the fantasy world and reality are clearly delineated from one another. An otherworldly invader enters the protagonist's life and forcibly takes them to the fantastic world. The language emphasises what the reader can see, hear, smell or touch, but not what they know.

One of Mendlesohn's examples is the story arc of Lucy Westenra in Bram Stoker's novel Dracula (1897)—Lucy leaves her own social group and moves towards the threat posed by Dracula. Mendlesohn also cites the work of writer H. P. Lovecraft; in addition, the author draws a parallel between this category and how a village's social fabric is disrupted by a murder in detective fiction.

=== Liminal fantasy ===
In the category of liminal fantasy, the reader or character is invited into the fantastic but refuses or cannot accept. This hesitation is related to the fantastic hesitation described by the literary critic Tzvetan Todorov, but Mendlesohn selected the term liminal because Todorov's hesitation seemed too narrow. This fantasy category is the most likely to cross genre boundaries.

With the denial, the fantastic can resist the denial, which Mendlesohn cites as generating horror in the novel The Subtle Knife (1997). Her detailed examples include Hope Mirrlees' novel Lud-in-the-Mist (1926) and Mervyn Peake's novel Titus Groan (1946).

=== "The irregulars" ===
Mendlesohn devotes a chapter to exploring narratives that may sit outside the four categories. For example, Susanna Clarke's novel Jonathan Strange & Mr Norrell (2004) may be immersive in some ways, but Clarke effectively deploys the rhetorical strategies of intrusion fantasy.

== Reception ==
Rhetorics of Fantasy was well received by reviewers. Michael Swanwick and John Clute regarded the book as very good. Clute concluded his positive review in the magazine Strange Horizons by saying that the "structure of our reading of fantasy will never be the same again". Clute criticised the selection of some of Mendlesohn's examples, particularly John Bunyan's 17th-century allegory The Pilgrim's Progress for exploring portal fantasy. In a review for the American journal Science Fiction Studies, Michael Levy wrote that Mendlesohn's work was of the same calibre as the influential works of fantasy scholarship that had influenced it. Ida Yoshinaga called Mendlesohn's reader-centric approach "a major contribution to fantasy studies".

Scholars have utilised Mendlesohn's theories for other works, including George R. R. Martin's series A Song of Ice and Fire.

== See also ==
- Farah Mendlesohn
- Fantasy literature
- Literary criticism
- Speculative fiction
- Narratology

== Bibliography ==
- Clute, John (9 June 2008). "Rhetorics of Fantasy by Farah Mendlesohn". Strange Horizons.
- Levy, Michael (2009). "The Skeletons and Exoskeletons of Genre". Science Fiction Studies. 36 (1): 139–143. doi:10.1525/sfs.36.1.0139. ISSN 0091-7729. JSTOR 25475213.
- Mendlesohn, Farah (2008). Rhetorics of Fantasy (1st ed.). Wesleyan University Press. ISBN 978-0-8195-6867-0.
- Sawyer, Andy (2009). "Review of Rhetorics of Fantasy". Utopian Studies. 20 (1): 175–179. doi:10.2307/20719935. ISSN 1045-991X. JSTOR 20719935.
- Yoshinaga, Ida (2010). "Review of Rhetorics of Fantasy". Marvels & Tales. 24 (1): 178–181. ISSN 1521-4281. JSTOR 41389040.
- Young, Joseph Rex (2019). George R. R. Martin and the Fantasy Form. Routledge. ISBN 978-1-351-38460-5.
