= BSFA Award for Best Long Non-Fiction =

Non-fiction award

BSFA Award for Best Non-Fiction
- Awarded for: The best science fiction or fantasy non-fiction published in the previous calendar year
- Country: UK
- Presented by: British Science Fiction Association
- First award: 2002
- Currently held by: Paul Kincaid, Colourfields: Writing About Writing About Science Fiction
- Website: BSFA Awards

The BSFA Awards are given every year by the British Science Fiction Association. The Best Long Non-Fiction award is open to any written work about science fiction or fantasy which appeared in its current form in the previous year. Whole collections of work that has been published elsewhere previously are ineligible as is work published by the BSFA. The award was previously named the BSFA Award for Best Non-Fiction; it was renamed to Best Long Non-Fiction in 2023.

== Winners and Shortlists ==
The ceremonies are named after the year that the eligible works were published, despite the awards being given out in the next year.

* Winners and joint winners

Year	Author(s)	Work	Publisher/Publication	Ref.
2001	Stephen Baxter*	Omegatropic	BSFA	
2001	Michelle Le Blanc & Colin Odell	Tim Burton	The Pocket Essentials	
2001	Andrew M. Butler	Terry Pratchett	The Pocket Essentials	
2001	Justina Robson	Storming the Bastille	The Alien Online (Jul '01)	
2001	Gene Wolfe	The Best Introduction to the Mountains	Interzone (#174, Dec '01)	
2002	David Langford*	Introduction to Maps: The Uncollected John Sladek	Big Engine	
2002	Nick Gevers & Christopher Priest	The Interrogation	Interzone (#183, Oct '02)	
2002	Oliver Morton	Mapping Mars	Fourth Estate	
2002	Lucius Shepard	Film review of The Time Machine	Electric Story 2 (Apr '02)	
2002	Frederick E. Smith	Once There Was a Magazine	Beacon	
2003	Farah Mendlesohn*	Reading Science Fiction	The Cambridge Companion to Science Fiction	
2003	John H. Arnold & Andy Wood	Nothing Is Written: Politics, Ideology and the Burden of History in the Fall Revolution Quartet	The True Knowledge of Ken MacLeod	
2003	Mike Ashley	The Profession of Science Fiction #58: Mapping the Territory	Foundation (#87)	
2003	M. J. Simpson	Hitchhiker: A Biography of Douglas Adams	Hodder & Stoughton	
2003	Cheryl Morgan	A Sick Mind book review of The Thackery T Lambshead Pocket Guide to Eccentric and Discredited Diseases	Emerald City (#97)	
2004	No award			
2005	Gary K. Wolfe*	Soundings: Reviews 1992–1996	Beccon	
2006	Paul Kincaid & Andrew M. Butler	The Arthur C. Clarke Award: A Critical Anthology	Serendip Foundation	
2006	Paul Gravett	Great British Comics	Aurum	
2006	Justine Larbalestier	Daughters of Earth: Feminist Science Fiction in the Twentieth Century	Wesleyan	
2006	Julie Phillips	James Tiptree, Jr.: The Double Life of Alice B. Sheldon	St. Martin's	
2006	Farah Mendlesohn	Polder: A Festschrift for John Clute and Judith Clute	Old Earth	
2007	No award			
2008	Farah Mendlesohn*	Rhetorics of Fantasy	Wesleyan	
2008	John Clute	Physics for Amnesia talk at the Science Fiction as a Literary Genre symposium	Gresham College	
2008	Roz Kaveney	Superheroes!: Capes and Crusaders in Comics and Films	I.B. Tauris	
2008	Paul Kincaid	What It Is We Do When We Read Science Fiction	Beccon	
2009	Nick Lowe*	Mutant Popcorn film review column	Interzone	
2009	John Clute	Canary Fever: Reviews	Beccon	
2009	Deepa D.	I Didn't Dream of Dragons	Deepa D. Blog	
2009	Farah Mendlesohn & Edward James	A Short History of Fantasy	Middlesex	
2010	Paul Kincaid*	Blogging the Hugos: Decline	Big Other	
2010	Jonathan Strahan & Gary K. Wolfe	Notes from Coode Street Podcast	Notes from Coode Street	
2010	Francis Spufford	Red Plenty	Faber & Faber	
2010	Adam Roberts	Book reviews of The Wheel of Time	Punkadiddle	
2010	Abigail Nussbaum	With Both Feet in the Clouds	Asking the Wrong Questions	
2011	John Clute*, Peter Nicholls* & David Langford*	The Encyclopedia of Science Fiction, Third Edition	SF Gateway	
2011	Mike Ashley	Out of This World: Science Fiction But Not as You Know It	British Library	
2011	Jared Shurin & Anne C. Perry	Pornokitsch	Pornokitsch	
2011	Abigail Nussbaum	Review of Arslan	Asking the Wrong Questions	
2011	Ian Sales	SF Mistressworks	SF Mistressworks	
2011	Graham Sleight, Tony Keen & Simon Bradshaw	The Unsilent Library: Essays on the Russell T. Davies Era of the New Doctor Who	Science Fiction Foundation	
2012	Lavie Tidhar*	The World SF Blog	The World SF Blog	
2012	Edward James & Farah Mendlesohn	The Cambridge Companion to Fantasy Literature	Cambridge	
2012	Karen Burnham	The Complexity of the Humble Space Suit in the book Rocket Science	Mutation	
2012	Paul Kincaid	The Widening Gyre	Los Angeles Review of Books	
2012	Maureen Kincaid Speller	The Shortlist Project	Paper Knife	
2013	Jeff VanderMeer*	Wonderbook	Abrams Image	
2013	Liz Bourke	Sleeps with Monsters	Tor	
2013	John J. Johnston	Going Forth by Night in Unearthed	Jurassic	
2014	Edward James*	Science Fiction and Fantasy Writers in the Great War	fantastic-writers-and-the-great-war.com	
2014	Karen Burnham	Greg Egan	Illinois	
2014	Paul Kincaid	Call and Response	Beccon	
2014	Niall Harrison	The State of British SF and Fantasy: A Symposium	Strange Horizons	
2014	Johnathan McCalmont	Deep Forests and Manicured Gardens: A Look at Two New Short Fiction Magazines	Ruthless Culture	
2015	Adam Roberts*	Rave and Let Die: The SF and Fantasy of 2014	Steel Quill	
2015	Nina Allan	Time Pieces: Doctor Change or Doctor Die	Interzone (Nov/Dec ‘15)	
2015	Alisa Krasnostein & Alexandra Pierce	Letters to Tiptree	Twelfth Planet	
2015	Jeff VanderMeer	From Annihilation to Acceptance: A Writer's Surreal Journey	The Atlantic (Jan ‘15)	
2015	Jonathan McCalmont	What Price, Your Critical Agency	Ruthless Culture	
2016	Geoff Ryman*	100 African Writers of SFF	tor.com	
2016	Erin Horakova	Boucher, Backbone and Blake: The Legacy of Blakes Seven	Strange Horizons	
2016	Anna McFarlane	Breaking the Cycle of the Golden Age: Jack Glass and Isaac Asimov's Foundation Trilogy	Adam Roberts: Critical Essays	
2016	Paul Graham Raven	New Model Authors? Authority, Authordom, Anarchism and the Atomized Text in a Networked World	Adam Roberts: Critical Essays	
2016	Rob Hansen	THEN: Science Fiction Fandom in the UK 1930-1980	Ansible	
2016	Ann VanderMeer & Jeff VanderMeer	Introduction	The Big Book of Science Fiction	
2017	Paul Kincaid*	Iain M. Banks	Illinois	
2017	Nina Allan, Maureen Kincaid Speller, Victoria Hoyle, Vajra Chandrasekera, Nick Hubble, Paul Kincaid, Jonathan McCalmont, Megan AM	The 2017 Shadow Clarke Award blog	Anglia Ruskin Centre for Science Fiction and Fantasy	
2017	Juliet E. McKenna	The Myth of Meritocracy and the Reality of the Leaky Pipe and Other Obstacles in Science Fiction & Fantasy	Gender Identity and Sexuality in Current Fantasy and Science Fiction	
2017	Vandana Singh	The Unthinkability of Climate Change: Thoughts on Amitav Ghosh's The Great Derangement	Strange Horizons	
2017	Adam Roberts	Blog posts for Wells at the World's End	Wells at the World's End	
2018	Aliette de Bodard*	On Motherhood and Erasure: People-Shaped Holes, Hollow Characters and the Illusion of Impossible Adventure	Intellectus Speculativus	
2018	Ruth EJ Booth	Noise and Sparks 2018 articles	Shoreline of Infinity	
2018	Nina Allan	Time Pieces 2018 articles	Interzone	
2018	Liz Bourke	Sleeps With Monsters 2018 articles	tor.com	
2018	Adam Roberts	Publishing the Science Fiction Canon: The Case of Scientific Romance	Cambridge	
2019	Farah Mendlesohn*	The Pleasant Profession of Robert A. Heinlein	Unbound	
2019	Glyn Morgan & C. Palmer-Patel	Sideways in Time: Critical Essays on Alternate History Fiction	Liverpool University Press	
2019	Gareth L. Powell	About Writing	Luna Press	
2019	Adam Roberts	H.G. Wells: A Literary Life	Palgrave Macmillan	
2019	Jo L. Walton	Away Day: Star Trek and the Utopia of Merit	Big Echo	
2020	Adam Roberts*	It's the End of the World: But What Are We Really Afraid Of	Elliot & Thompson	
2020	Francesca T. Barbini	Ties That Bind: Love in Science Fiction and Fantasy	Luna Press	
2020	Paul Kincaid	The Unstable Realities of Christopher Priest	Liverpool University Press	
2020	Andrew Milner & J. R. Burgmann	Science Fiction and Climate Change	Liverpool University Press	
2020	Jo L. Walton	Estranged Entrepreneurs	Foundation 137	
2020	Jo Walton	Books in Which No Bad Things Happen	Tor	
2021	Francesca T. Barbini*	Worlds Apart: Worldbuilding in Fantasy and Science Fiction	Luna Publishing	
2021	Liz Batty, John Coxon, & Alison Scott	Octothorpe Podcast	Octothorpe	
2021	Mark Bould	The Anthropocene Unconscious: Climate Catastrophe Culture	Verso Books	
2021	Anna McFarlane	Cyberpunk Culture and Psychology: Seeing Through the Mirrorshades	Routledge	
2021	Joy Sanchez-Taylor	Diverse Futures: Science Fiction and Authors of Color	Ohio State Press	
2021	Val Nolan	Science Fiction and the Pathways out of the COVID Crisis	The Polyphony	
2022	Rob Wilkins*	Terry Pratchett: A Life with Footnotes	Doubleday	
2022	Oghenechovwe Donald Ekpeki	Too Dystopian for Whom? A Continental Nigerian Writer's Perspective	Uncanny Magazine	
2022	Fiona Moore	Management Lessons from Game of Thrones: Organization Theory and Strategy in Westeros	Edward Elgar Publishing	
2022	Wole Talabi and the ASFS	Preliminary Observations from an Incomplete History of African SFF	SFWA	
2022	Maureen Kincaid Speller	The Critic and the Clue: Tracking Alan Garner's Treacle Walker	Strange Horizons	
2023	Nina Allan*	A Traveller in Time: The Critical Practice of Maureen Kincaid Speller	Luna Press	
2023	Tiffani Angus and Val Nolan	Spec Fic for Newbies: A Beginner's Guide to Writing Subgenres of Science Fiction, Fantasy, and Horror	Luna Press	
2023	Niall Harrison	All These Worlds	Briardene	
2023	Chinelo Onwualu	Ex Marginalia: Essays on Writing Speculative Fiction by Persons of Color	Hydra House	
2023	Farah Mendlesohn	The Female Man: Eastercon talk	n/a	
2025	Paul Kincaid*	Colourfields: Writing About Writing About Science Fiction	Briardene Books	
2025	Dan Coxon and Richard Hirst	Writing the Magic: Essays on Crafting Fantasy Fiction	Dead Ink	
2025	Kate Holterhoff	Speculation and the Darwinian Method in British Romance Fiction, 1859-1914	Ohio University Press	
2025	Joy Sanchez-Taylor	Dispelling Fantasies: Authors of Colour Re-imagining a Genre	Ohio State University Press	
2025	Adam Roberts	Fantasy: A Short History	Bloomsbury Academic	
2025	Payton McCarty-Simas	That Very Witch: Fear, Feminism and the American With Film	Luna Press	
