= Jessica's Guide to Dating on the Dark Side =

2009 novel by Beth Fantaskey

- First edition
- Author: Beth Fantaskey
- Language: English
- Genre: Paranormal
- Published: 2009 (Harcourt)
- ISBN: 0-15-206384-6

Jessica's Guide to Dating on the Dark Side is a young adult novel by Beth Fantaskey. The book was published by Graphia Houghton Mifflin Harcourt in 2009.

In the book, Jessica, a 17-year-old adopted child, discovers that she is a descendant of vampire royalty.

== Reception ==
It was reviewed in Kirkus Reviews and Bulletin of the Center for Children's Books. It received a starred review from Publishers Weekly.

== Sequels ==
The books was followed byJessica Rules the Dark Side, published in 2012.
