= Cannibal Reign =

2012 novel by Thomas Koloniar

- First edition
- Author: Thomas Koloniar
- Language: English
- Genre: Post-apocalyptic fiction
- Publication date: June 26, 2012
- Publication place: United States

Cannibal Reign is a 2012 novel by Thomas Koloniar, published by Simon & Schuster. It is a post-apocalyptic tale of human behavior after an asteroid destroys the United States.

== Plot summary ==
Astronomer Marty Chittenden discovers an asteroid on its way to earth. He brings his discovery of this asteroid to a former classmate from graduate school, Susan, who he has not seen in five years, but is still in love with. Soon, both Marty and Susan realize that the government is aware about the asteroid and its inevitable trajectory to hit the United States, and will take whatever means necessary to keep it secret.

Former Green Beret Jack Forrest already knows about this catastrophe thanks to one of his government contacts. Forrest begins stockpiling an abandoned missile silo with supplies with three of his most trusted former soldiers, a couple of doctors as well as women and children he will try to save.

== Reception ==
SF Revu described Reign as "very well written for a first novel", and "a page turner", albeit with a "cave man perspective" and a protagonist who is "strong jawed, democratic (until it comes time for him to make the right decision and then it does not matter what anyone else thinks), and surrounded by adoring women".

Pornokitsch stated that Reign was "one to watch".
