= The Bulletin of the Center for Children's Books =

American academic journal

- Discipline: Children's literature, library science, literary criticism
- Language: English
- Edited by: Kate Quealy-Gainer

Publication details
- History: 1945–present
- Publisher: Johns Hopkins University Press for the Center for Children's Books at UIUC Graduate School of Library and Information Science (United States)
- Frequency: 11/year

Standard abbreviations
- ISO 4: Bull. Cent. Child.'s Books

Indexing
- ISSN: 0008-9036 (print); 1558-6766 (web)
- OCLC no.: 4123300

Links
- Journal homepage; Online access

The Bulletin of the Center for Children's Books is an academic journal established in 1945 by Frances E. Henne at the University of Chicago Graduate Library School.

From 1955 to 1985 it was edited by Zena Sutherland.

Following the Graduate Library School closure in 1990 the Bulletin was moved to the University of Illinois Urbana-Champaign.

Betsy Hearne was editor from 1985 to 1994.

Roger Sutton held editorial responsibilities from 1988 to 1996 including editor-in-chief. In 1996 he was appointed editor of The Horn Book Magazine.

Deborah Stevenson was editor-in chief from 1989 to 2021. In a Hopkins Press Podcast in 2021 she provided an assessment of the first 75 years of the journal.

Kate Quealy-Gainer became editor-in-chief in 2021 based at the University of Illinois Urbana-Champaign.

The journal publishes reviews of the latest in children's literature in order to assist librarians and school instructors in their educational mission.

The journal is published by the Johns Hopkins University Press.

== See also ==
- Children's literature criticism
- Children's literature periodicals
