= R. Howard Bloch =

American literary critic

- Education: Professor

R. Howard Bloch is an American author and literary critic who has been the Sterling Professor of French at Yale University since 2005. Bloch was elected to the American Philosophical Society in 2010.

On April 29, 2018, Howard Bloch married Ellen Handler Spitz in a private religious ceremony that took place in their home in Hamden, Connecticut, the former dwelling place of American novelist and playwright Thornton Wilder, who built the house with the proceeds from his novel The Bridge of San Luis Rey.

== Bibliography ==
- Etymologies and Genealogies: A Literary Anthropology of the French Middle Ages (University of Chicago Press, 1986) ISBN 9780226059822
- The Scandal of the Fabliaux (University of Chicago Press, 1986) ISBN 9780226059754
- Moses in the Promised Land (1988) ISBN 9780879052164
- editor, Misogyny, Misandry, and Misanthropy (University of California Press, 1989) ISBN 9780520065468
- Medieval Misogyny and the Invention of Western Romantic Love (University of Chicago Press, 1991) ISBN 9780226059730
- God’s Plagiarist: Being an Account of the Fabulous Industry and Irregular Commerce of the Abbé Migne (University of Chicago Press, 1994) ISBN 9780226059709
- The Anonymous Marie de France (University of Chicago Press, 2003) ISBN 9780226059686
- A Needle in the Right Hand of God: The Norman Conquest of 1066 and the Making and Meaning of the Bayeux Tapestry (Random House, 2006) ISBN 9781400065493
- One Toss of the Dice: The Incredible Story of How a Poem Made Us Modern (2016) ISBN 9780871406637
- Paris and Her Cathedrals (2022) ISBN 9781631493928
