= Beth Fantaskey =

American author

Beth Fantaskey is an American author of children's and young adult fiction.

She attended Shippensburg where she earned an English degree. She has a Ph.D. in media history from Penn State. She worked as a speechwriter after college and then became a journalist.

Her debut novel, Jessica's Guide to Dating on the Dark Side, sold over 45,000 copies in its first few months of publication.

She lives in Lewisburg, Pennsylvania. She teaches at Susquehanna University.

== Reception ==
Jessica's Guide to Dating on the Dark Side and Buzz Kill received starred reviews from Publishers Weekly.

== Selected works ==
- Jessica's Guide to Dating on the Dark Side. Harcourt, 2009. ISBN 9780152063849
- Jekel Loves Hyde. Harcourt, 2010. ISBN 9780152063900
- Jessica Rules the Dark Side. Harcourt, 2012. ISBN 9780547393094
- Buzz Kill. HMH Books, 2014. ISBN 978-0-547-39310-0
- Isabel Feeney, Star Reporter. HMH Books, 2016. ISBN 978-0-544-58249-1
