= Ellen Handler Spitz =

American art historian

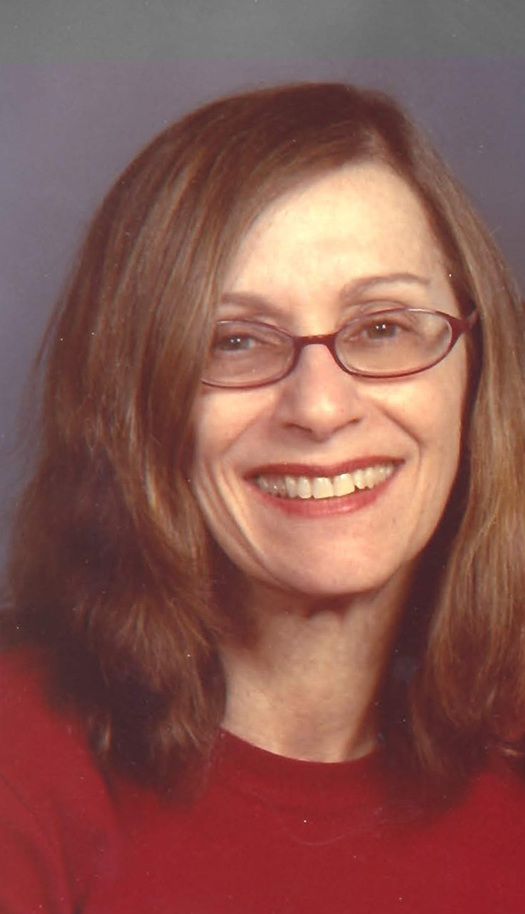
- Born: Ellen Handler Spitz; New York City, US
- Occupations: author, lecturer, professor
- Writing career
- Subjects: children, psychology and the arts
- Website: ellenhandlerspitz.net

Ellen Handler Spitz is an American writer and academic noted for her expertise on children, psychology, and the arts. She is an internationally acclaimed author and lecturer on children's cultural lives and on children's literature. She is known for her numerous articles in The New Republic examining how the arts and culture interweave and continuously transform daily life from explorations of Maurice Sendak and sexuality to the role of children's books in India. She is an internationally noted authority on psychoanalysis and the arts.

== Early life and education ==
Spitz was born in New York City. She was educated at the Pax Hill School, Surrey, England, University of Chicago and Barnard College and took her master's degree and doctoral degrees at Harvard and Columbia Universities respectively, where she studied fine arts and aesthetics. She also studied for four years in the 1980s as a special research candidate at the Columbia University Center for Psychoanalytic Training and Research.

Spitz served a brief stint as a reporter at Newsweek magazine, taught art history and studio art to children and adolescents in Providence, Rhode Island, and New York, where she was elected to membership in the Mamaroneck Artists Guild and exhibited woodcuts and drawings; she also performed with the Potpourri Dancers, a modern dance company based in Croton-on-Hudson.

Spitz was married on April 29, 2018, to R. Howard Bloch, Sterling Professor of French at Yale University. She divides her time between Manhattan and New Rochelle, NY. She is the mother of Jennifer Beulah Lew, Nathaniel Geoffrey Lew, and Rivi Handler-Spitz.

== International media and teaching ==
Spitz's academic work often concerns current events as well as books and subjects that appear in popular culture. For instance, following the death of famed children's author Maurice Sendak, National Public Radio interviewed Spitz for her insights on his life and enduring influence. Another example is her 2011 interview about The Wonderful Wizard of Oz and its 1939 film adaption on Australian Broadcasting Corporation's The Book Show.

Ellen Handler Spitz, as of April, 2020, has received the title of professor emerita in the Humanities from the University of Maryland (UMBC). Ongoing since 2019, she is a Senior Lecturer in the Directed Studies Program at Yale University. In addition, Spitz has taught in programs for gifted youth and in university settings that include Barnard College, New York University, Rutgers University, Stanford University, and the Hebrew University of Jerusalem.

== Books ==
Drawing on her early experience as an artist, Ellen Handler Spitz then went on to establish her writing career by exploring the arts psychologically and by examining their relationship to childhood. Her work ranges topically from painting and sculpture to observations on ancient Greek drama and children's literature, but it always concerns the intersection of art, psychology, and childhood.

Spitz's closely argued book Art and Psyche explores the relations between art and mind by using psychoanalytic thought. It uniquely demonstrates how three major models follow the history of ideas in art and literary criticism, in philosophical aesthetics, and in the development of psychoanalytic theory. Spitz's models are: the relations between an artist's life and work, the work of art itself, and the relations between a work of art and its audience or beholders. To illustrate her theoretical discussion, Spitz draws on a wide variety of art forms, including painting, sculpture, literature, music, and dance. Art and Psyche is read on college campuses both in the US and abroad and has been translated into Italian, Chinese, and Serbian.

Image and Insight examines the paradox of looking within and outward at the same time. Spitz's metaphor for this project is Teiresias, the blind seer of ancient Greece, and she works psychologically with a wide swath of subjects including 1970s NYC subway car graffiti, a 1987 exhibition of African sculpture, a composition of postmodern music, and paintings by a schizophrenic child, among others.

Museums of the Mind begins with a psychologically inflected, thematic study of selected paintings by the distinguished Belgian Surrealist René Magritte, in which Spitz traces the effects of the artist's mother's suicide by drowning when he was a boy. Noted art critic Donald Kuspit writes "This section on Magritte is perhaps the definitive analysis of his art." Spitz's work on Magritte is the only extant book-length study of the artist from a psychoanalytic perspective, and it was reissued in 2014 as an eBook under the title Magritte's Labyrinth.

Inside Picture Books explores why stories and images shown to us as children linger in our minds, and how it is that some children's books survive while others fade. Spitz discusses the ways classic children's books transmit wisdom, shape tastes, implant subtle biases, and stimulate moral reflection. She advocates for conversational reading between adults and children and addresses powerful topics such as curiosity, identity and self-acceptance, separation and loss, as well as disobedience. Inside Picture Books exemplifies Spitz's interdisciplinary academic approach, which can pose challenges to conventional researchers. For instance, in Children's Literature (journal), Philip Nel evaluates the book from the perspective of a narrowly focused historian of children's literature. On the other hand, Inside Picture Books has been acclaimed as a classic among scholars of its intended genre of interpretive psychology, being praised by such innovative and widely acclaimed notables as Quentin Blake, Marina Warner, Judith Wallerstein, Pat Schroeder, Maria Tatar, and Pamela Paul.

In The Brightening Glance, Spitz asks how the imagination emerges and develops in young children. She shows how a child's gaze magnifies the sensory and perceptual world and how children make no hard distinctions between art and nature, reality and make-believe. Aesthetic and psychological growth intersect, she reveals, and she shows how, by observing what holds a child's attention, we can promote growth and also rediscover our own worlds through freshly reawakened eyes.

== Bibliography ==
- Art and Psyche (Yale Univ. Press, 1985) ISBN 978-0-300-04620-5
- Image and Insight (Columbia Univ. Press, 1991) ISBN 0-231-07297-X
- Museums of the Mind (Yale Univ. Press, 1994) ISBN 0-300-06029-7
- Freud and Forbidden Knowledge, co-edited with P. Rudnytsky (N.Y.U. Press, 1994) ISBN 9780814774373
- Bertolucci’s ‘The Last Emperor’: Multiple Takes, co-edited with Sklarew et al (Wayne State, 1998) ISBN 0-8143-2700-1
- Inside Picture Books (Yale Univ. Press, 1999) ISBN 9780300084764
- The Brightening Glance: Imagination and Childhood (Anchor, 2006) ISBN 978-0-385-72005-2
- Illuminating Childhood (Univ. of Michigan Press, 2012) ISBN 978-0-472-03507-6
- Magritte's Labyrinth (212 Books, William Morris Endeavor, 2014) eBook
- Contribution to 'A Velocity of Being: Letters to a Young Reader,' edited by Maria Popova & Claudia Bedrick (Enchanted Lion Books, 2018) ISBN 978-1592702282
