= Francelia Butler =

American writer

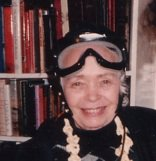
- Francelia Butler at her home in Mansfield Hollow, CT., c. early 1990s
- Born: Francelia McWilliams; April 25, 1913; Cleveland, Ohio, U.S.
- Died: September 18, 1998 (aged 85); Windham, Connecticut, U.S.
- Occupations: Writer, professor
- Spouse: Jerome Butler (m. 1939; died 1949)

Francelia McWilliams Butler (April 25, 1913 – September 18, 1998) was an American scholar, pioneer and writer of children's literature. She is also known for creating the International Peace Games.

== Biography ==
Butler was born in Cleveland, Ohio. She received a BA from Oberlin College, an MA from Georgetown University, and a Ph.D. from the University of Virginia.

Francelia married Jerome Butler who worked as a journalist for the Paris Herald Tribune (which became the International Herald Tribune). Her husband died in 1949.

First a journalist, then a professor, Francelia Butler taught at the University of Connecticut from the 1960s to the early 1990s. Officially titled "Children's Literature 200," the class was affectionately nicknamed “Kiddie Lit” by students. Its curriculum included guest lecturers such as Dr. Benjamin Spock and Madeleine L'Engle. Butler retired from UCONN in 1992.

Francelia Butler created the International Peace Games, then Peace First and now Peace by PEACE. She founded the scholarly journal Children's Literature at Hollins University. When much of the university's collection was ruined in a flood, Butler donated her own extensive collection of children's literature. The Graduate Program of Children's Literature at Hollins University founded an annual conference in her memory.

The university student-run program she developed as "Peace Games" at the University of Connecticut in 1989 lives on today as Peace by PEACE at the University of Connecticut and the University of Toronto, York University, and McGill University in Canada.

== Books and articles ==
- The Lucky Piece
- "The Relationship Between Moral Competence and Old Age in Richard II, 2 Henry IV, and Henry V"
- "Sharing Literature With Children: A Thematic Approach to Children's Literature"
- "Skipping Around the World: The Ritual Nature of Folk Rhymes"
- The Melted Refrigerator: Comedy and Combat in the Life of a Woman (2013)
- "With many battles won, a retired professor of children's literature fights fiercely for peace." New York Times Education Wednesday, May 11, 1994 Michael Winerip
