= Fantasy =

Literary genre

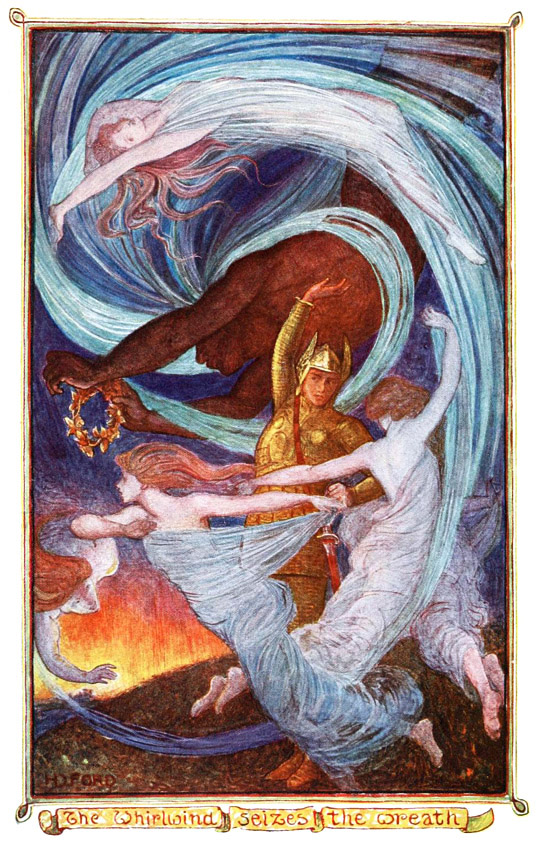
Illustration "The Whirlwind Seizes the Wreath" by H. J. Ford (from the story "The Fairy Aurora")

Fantasy is a genre of speculative fiction that involves supernatural or magical elements, often including completely imaginary realms and creatures.

The genre's roots lie in fantasy literature and drama. From the twentieth century onward, it has expanded into various media, including film, television, graphic novels, manga, animation, and video games.

The expression fantastic literature is often used for this genre by Anglophone literary critics. An archaic spelling for the term is phantasy.

== Characteristics ==
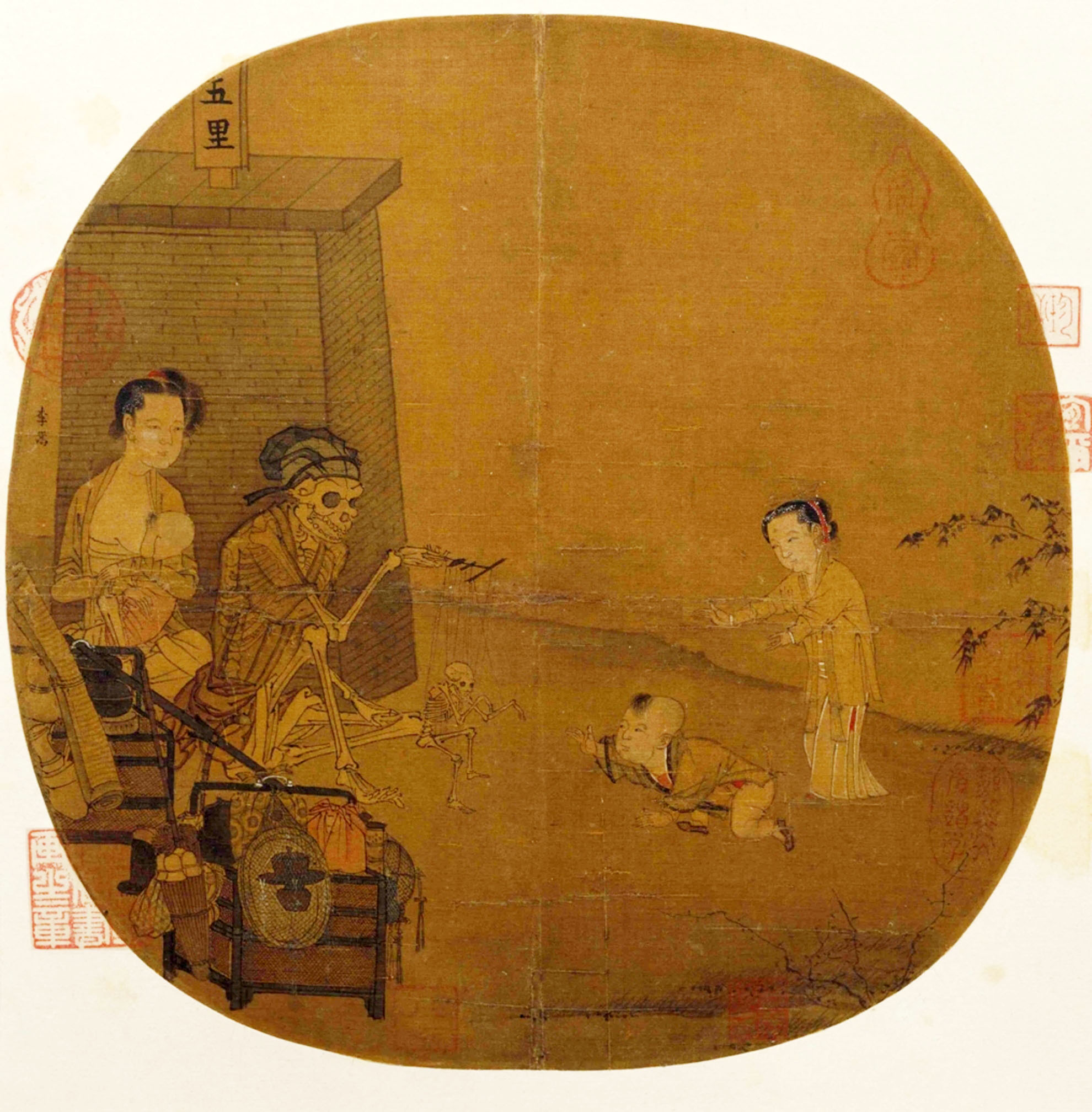
Painting Skeleton Fantasy Show (骷髏幻戲圖) by Li Song (1190–1264)

Many works of fantasy use magic or other supernatural elements as a main plot element, theme, or setting. Magic, magic practitioners (sorcerers, witches and so on) and magical creatures are common in many of these worlds.

An identifying trait of fantasy is the author's use of narrative elements that do not have to rely on history or nature to be coherent. This differs from realistic fiction in that realistic fiction has to attend to the history and natural laws of reality, where fantasy does not. In writing fantasy the author uses worldbuilding to create characters, situations, and settings that may not be possible in reality.

Many fantasy authors use real-world folklore and mythology as inspiration; and although another defining characteristic of the fantasy genre is the inclusion of supernatural elements, such as magic, this does not have to be the case.

Fantasy has often been compared to science fiction and horror because they are the major categories of speculative fiction. Many prominent theorists agree that fantasy can generally be distinguished from science fiction on the basis of the plausibility of the narrative elements. A science fiction narrative may be about the unlikely, though grounded in the scientifically plausible, while fantasy narratives construct the impossible. Authors have to rely on the readers' suspension of disbelief, an acceptance of the unbelievable or impossible for the sake of enjoyment, in order to write effective fantasies. Despite both genres' heavy reliance on the supernatural, fantasy and horror are distinguishable from one another. Horror primarily evokes fear through the protagonists' weaknesses or inability to deal with the antagonists.

== History ==
=== Early history ===
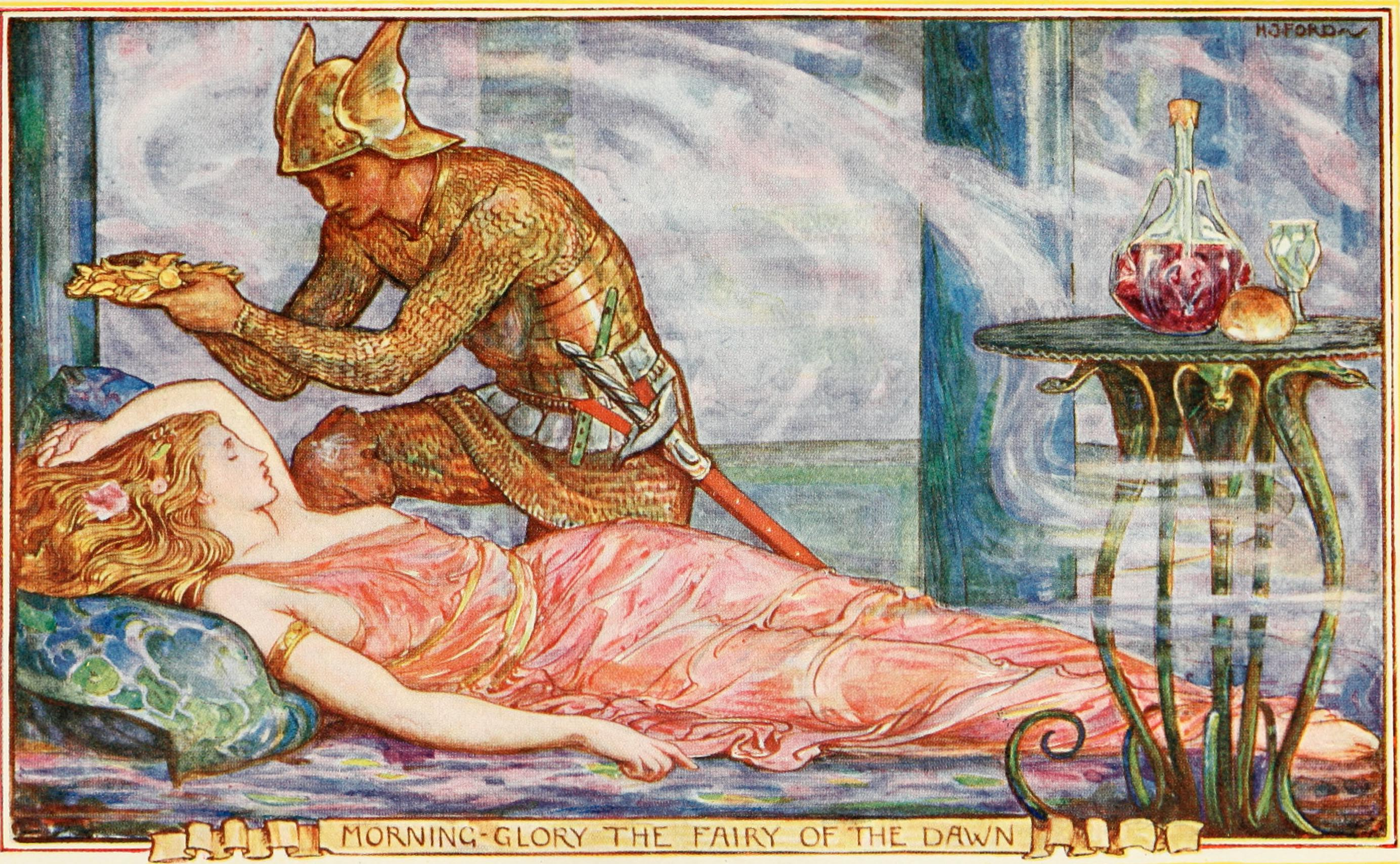
Illustration from the story "The Fairy of the Dawn" in The Violet Fairy Book (1906)

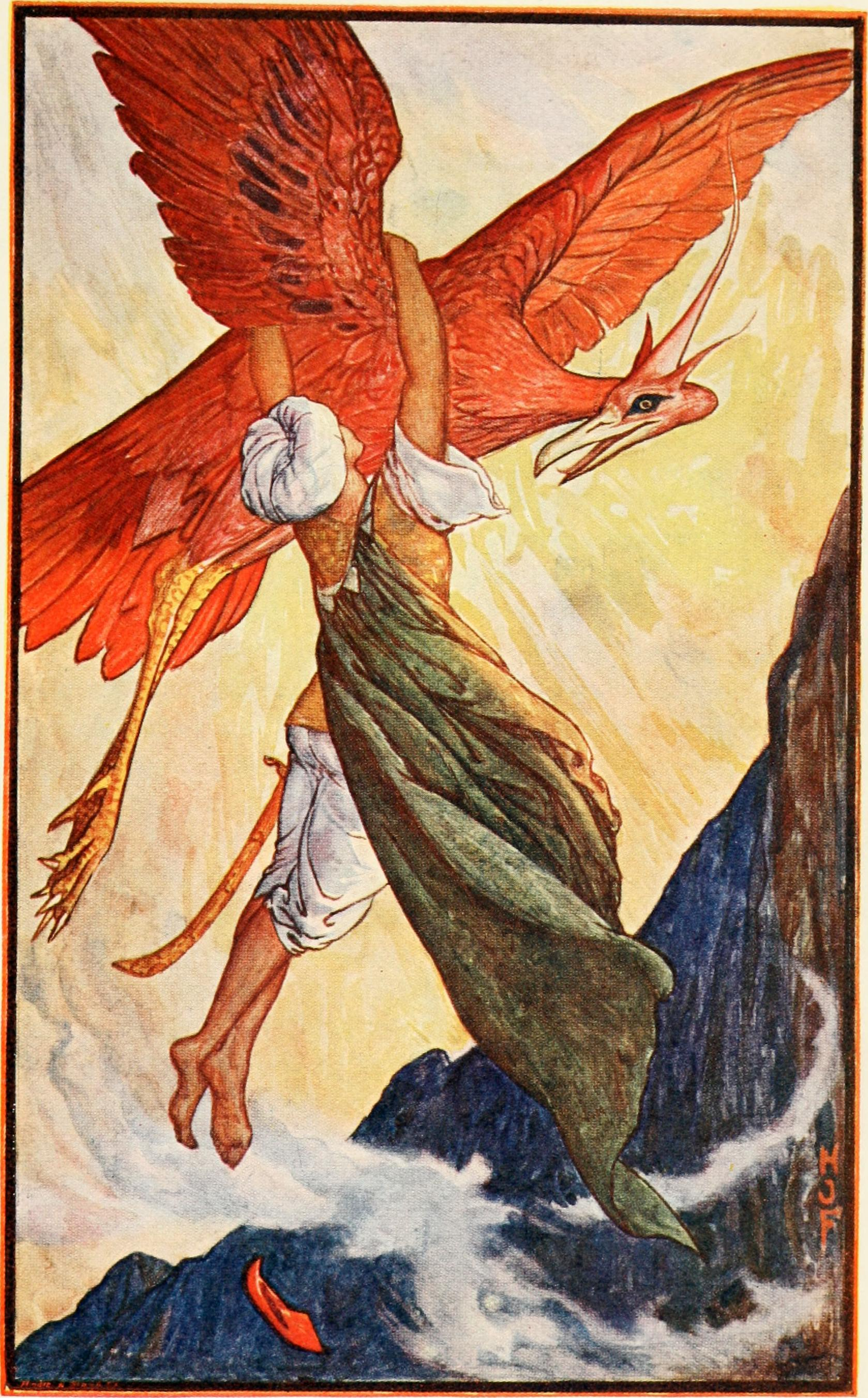
Another illustration from The Violet Fairy Book (1906)

While elements of the supernatural and the fantastic were part of literature from its beginning, fantasy elements also occur throughout ancient religious texts such as the Epic of Gilgamesh. The ancient Babylonian creation epic, the Enûma Eliš, in which the god Marduk slays the goddess Tiamat, reflects the theme of cosmic conflict between good and evil, which is characteristic of the modern fantasy genre. Genres of romantic and fantasy literature also existed in ancient Egypt. The Tales of the Court of King Khufu, which is preserved in the Westcar Papyrus and was probably written in the middle of the second half of the eighteenth century BC, preserves a mixture of stories with elements of historical fiction, fantasy, and satire. Egyptian funerary texts preserve mythological tales, the most significant of which are the myths of Osiris and his son Horus.

Myth with fantastic elements intended for adults were a major genre of ancient Greek literature. The comedies of Aristophanes are filled with fantastic elements, particularly his play The Birds, in which an Athenian man persuades the world's birds to build a city in the clouds and thereby challenges Zeus's authority. Ovid's Metamorphoses and Apuleius's The Golden Ass are both works that influenced the development of the fantasy genre by taking mythic elements and weaving them into personal accounts. Both works involve complex narratives in which humans beings are transformed into animals or inanimate objects. Platonic teachings and early Christian theology are major influences on the modern fantasy genre. Plato used allegories to convey many of his teachings, and early Christian writers interpreted both the Old and New Testaments as employing parables to convey spiritual truths. This ability to find meaning in a story that is not literally true became the foundation for developing the modern fantasy genre.

Islamic, Hindu, and Chinese sources contain fantasy elements as well. The best-known fiction from the Islamic world is One Thousand and One Nights (The Arabian Nights), which is a compilation of ancient and medieval folk tales. Various characters from this epic have become cultural icons in Western culture, such as Aladdin, Sinbad, and Ali Baba. Hindu mythology was an evolution of the earlier Vedic mythology and had many more fantastical stories and characters, particularly in the Indian epics. The Panchatantra (Fables of Bidpai), for example, used animal fables and magical tales to illustrate the central Indian principles of political science. Chinese traditions have been particularly influential in the vein of fantasy known as Chinoiserie, which includes such writers as Ernest Bramah and Barry Hughart.

Beowulf is among the best known of the Old English tales in the English-speaking world, and it has deeply influenced the fantasy genre; several fantasy works have retold the story, for example, John Gardner's novel Grendel. Norse mythology, as found in the Elder Edda and Younger Edda collections, includes such figures as the god Odin and his fellow Aesir, in addition to dwarves, elves, dragons, and giants. These elements have been directly imported into various fantasy works. The distinct folklores of Ireland, Wales, and Scotland have sometimes been used indiscriminately for "Celtic" fantasy, sometimes with great success; other writers have specified the use of a single source. The Welsh tradition has been particularly influential, because of its connection to the legendary King Arthur and its collection into a single work, the epic Mabinogion.

There are many works where the boundary between fantasy and other genres is unclear: did the writers believe in the possibility of the marvels in the play A Midsummer Night's Dream or the romance in Sir Gawain and the Green Knight? This question makes it difficult to distinguish when fantasy began, in its modern sense.

=== Modern fantasy ===
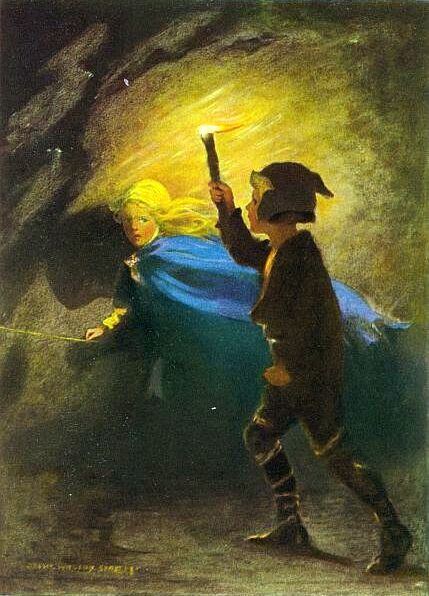
Illustration from 1920 edition of George MacDonald's novel The Princess and the Goblin

Although pre-dated by John Ruskin's story The King of the Golden River (1841), the history of modern fantasy literature is usually said to begin with George MacDonald, the Scottish author of such novels as Phantastes (1858) and The Princess and the Goblin (1872); the former is widely considered to be the first fantasy novel ever written for adults. MacDonald was a major influence on both J. R. R. Tolkien and C. S. Lewis. The other major fantasy author of this era was William Morris, an English poet who wrote several novels in the latter part of the century, including The Wood Beyond the World (1894) and The Well at the World's End (1896).

Despite MacDonald's future influence with the novel At the Back of the North Wind (1871), Morris's popularity with his contemporaries, and H. G. Wells's novel The Wonderful Visit (1895), it was not until the 20th century that fantasy fiction began to reach a large audience. Lord Dunsany established the genre's popularity in both the novel and the short story forms. H. Rider Haggard, Rudyard Kipling, and Edgar Rice Burroughs began to write fantasy around this time. These authors, along with Abraham Merritt, established what was known as the lost world subgenre; this was the most popular form of fantasy in the early decades of the 20th century, although several classic children's fantasies, such as Peter Pan and The Wonderful Wizard of Oz, were also published around this time.

Juvenile fantasy was considered more acceptable than fantasy intended for adults, with the consequence that writers who wished to write fantasy for adults needed to fit their work into forms aimed at children. Nathaniel Hawthorne wrote fantasy in A Wonder-Book for Girls and Boys, intended for children, although his works for adults only verged on fantasy. For many years, this book and successes such as the novel Alice's Adventures in Wonderland (1865) created a circular effect: all fantasy works, even the later series The Lord of the Rings, were therefore classified as children's literature.

Political and social trends can affect a society's reception of fantasy. In the early 20th century, the New Culture Movement's enthusiasm for Westernization and science in China compelled them to condemn the fantastical shenmo genre of traditional Chinese literature. The spells and magical creatures in these novels were viewed as superstitious and backward, products of a feudal society hindering the modernization of China. Stories of the supernatural continued to be denounced once the Communists rose to power, and mainland China experienced a revival in fantasy only after the Cultural Revolution had ended.

Fantasy became a genre of pulp magazines published in the West. The first all-fantasy fiction magazine, Weird Tales, was published in 1923. Many similar magazines eventually followed, including The Magazine of Fantasy and Science Fiction (F&SF). When this magazine was founded in 1949, the pulp format was at the height of its popularity; F&SF was instrumental in bringing fantasy fiction to a wide audience in both the US and the UK. Such magazines were also instrumental in the rise of science fiction, and the two genres were first associated with each other around this time.

By 1950, sword and sorcery fiction had begun to find a wider audience, with the success of Robert E. Howard's Conan the Barbarian stories and Fritz Leiber's Fafhrd and the Gray Mouser stories. However, it was the advent of high fantasy—especially J. R. R. Tolkien's novels The Hobbit and The Lord of the Rings, which reached new heights of popularity in the late 1960s—that allowed fantasy to enter the mainstream. Several other series, such as C. S. Lewis's The Chronicles of Narnia and Ursula K. Le Guin's Earthsea, helped to cement the genre's popularity.

The popularity of the fantasy genre has continued to increase in the 21st century, as evidenced by the best-selling status of several series: J. K. Rowling's Harry Potter, Robert Jordan's The Wheel of Time, George R. R. Martin's Song of Ice and Fire, Steven Erikson's Malazan Book of the Fallen, Brandon Sanderson's The Stormlight Archive and Mistborn, and A. Sapkowski's The Witcher.

== Media ==
Several fantasy film adaptations have achieved blockbuster status, most notably The Lord of the Rings film trilogy directed by Peter Jackson, and the Harry Potter films, two of the highest-grossing film series in cinema history.

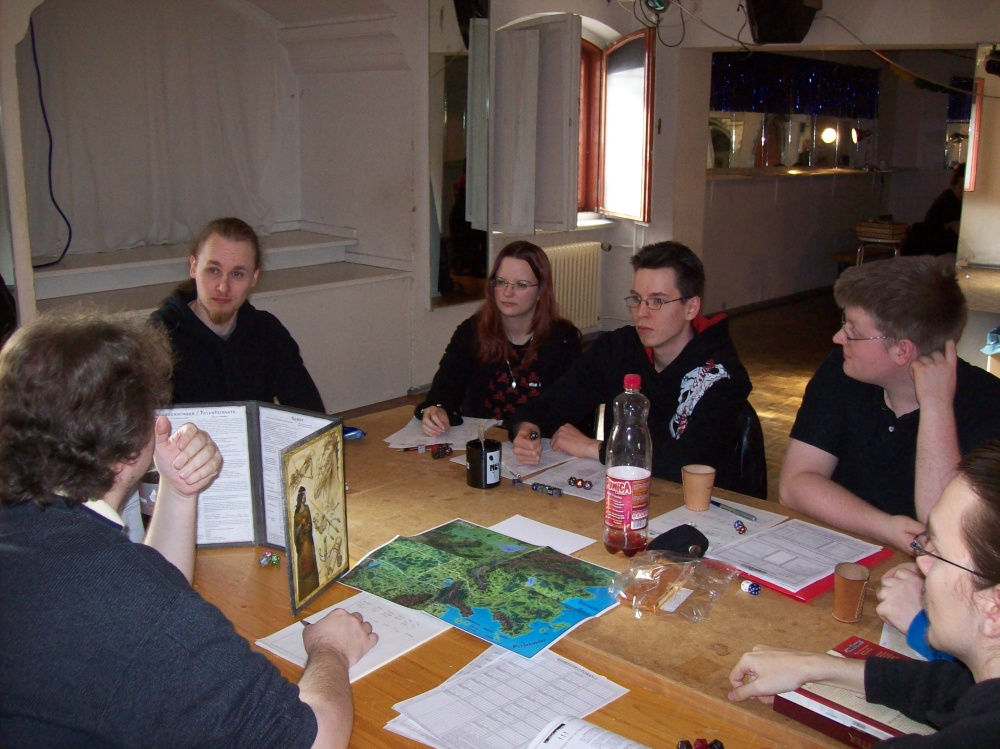
A group playing a tabletop role-playing game (RPG). The Games Master is at left using a cardboard screen to hide dice rolls from the players.

Fantasy role-playing games (RPGs) span several media. Dungeons & Dragons (D&D) was the first tabletop role-playing game, and it remains the most successful and influential. According to a 1999 survey in the United States, six percent of 12- to 35-year-olds have played role-playing games. Of those who play regularly, two thirds play D&D. Products branded Dungeons & Dragons accounted for over fifty percent of the RPG products sold in 2005.

The science fantasy role-playing game series Final Fantasy has been an icon of the role-playing video game genre. (As of 2012, it was still among the top ten best-selling video game franchises.) The first collectible card game, Magic: The Gathering, has a fantasy theme and is similarly dominant in the industry.

== Classification ==
=== By theme (subgenres) ===
Fantasy encompasses numerous subgenres characterized by particular themes or settings, or by an overlap with other literary genres or forms of speculative fiction. These subgenres include the following:

- Comic fantasy, humorous in tone
- Contemporary fantasy, set in the modern world or a world based on a contemporary era, but involving magic or other supernatural elements
- Dark fantasy, including elements of horror fiction
- Fables, stories with non-human characters, leading to morals or lessons
- Fairy tales themselves, as well as fairytale fantasy, which draws on fairy tale themes
- Heroic fantasy, concerned with stories of heroes in imaginary lands
- Historical fantasy, historical fiction with fantasy elements
- Romantic fantasy, focusing on romantic relationships
- Science fantasy, fantasy incorporating elements from science fiction such as advanced technology, aliens and space travel, but also fantastical things
- Steampunk, a genre which is sometimes a kind of fantasy, with elements from 19th century steam technology (historical fantasy and science fantasy both overlap with this genre)

=== By setting ===
A fundamental categorization within fantasy literature is the distinction between high and low fantasy. The commonly recognized and basic distinguishing feature between these two is setting, or more specifically, the type of world described. The distinct categories of high and low are not rigidly aligned with classifications based on other frameworks.

Works classified as high fantasy are those that take place in a distinct secondary world. This concept of a secondary world is distinct from the primary, or "real," world in that its operational order—which some scholars term nonrational—incorporates supernatural and magical phenomena. J.R.R. Tolkien's essay "On Fairy-Stories" remains a seminal and influential work on magical secondary worlds. It establishes the secondary world's distinctness from the primary world and develops what Tolkien identified as the necessity of "secondary belief" for high fantasy to be successful.

Low fantasy encompasses works that take place in our primary world, or a world not identifiably distinct from ours, where the general operational order is explained via natural law. In these works, magical or nonrational phenomena are observed within the rational primary world without ordered causality or natural explanation.

=== By narrative function ===
In her book Rhetorics of Fantasy (2008), Farah Mendlesohn proposes a taxonomy of fantasy, as "determined by the means by which the fantastic enters the narrated world." (She notes some fantasies fit none of the patterns in this taxonomy.) The taxonomy categories are as follows:

Portal fantasy
In portal fantasy or portal-quest fantasy, a fantasy world is entered, within which the fantastic elements remain contained. A portal-quest fantasy typically tends to be a quest-type narrative, whose main challenge is navigating the fantastical world. Notable examples include L. Frank Baum's novel The Wonderful Wizard of Oz (1900), C. S. Lewis' novel The Lion, the Witch and the Wardrobe (1950), and Stephen R. Donaldson's series The Chronicles of Thomas Covenant (late 1970s). In Japan, the genre of portal fantasy is known as isekai (Japanese: 異世界; transl. "different world" or "otherworld"), which has developed its own set of conventions.
Immersive fantasy
In immersive fantasy, the fictional world is seen as complete; its fantastic elements remain unquestioned within the context of the story; and the reader perceives the world through the eyes and ears of characters native to the setting. This narrative mode "consciously negates the sense of wonder" often associated with science fiction, according to Mendlesohn. She adds that "a sufficiently effective immersive fantasy may be indistinguishable from science fiction" as the fantastic "acquires a scientific cohesion all of its own". This similarity has led to disputes about how to classify novels such as Mary Gentle's Ash (2000) and China Miéville's Perdido Street Station (2000).
Intrusion fantasy
In intrusion fantasy, the fantastic intrudes on reality (as opposed to portal fantasies, where characters from reality intrude on the fantastic world), and the protagonists' engagement with that intrusion drives the story. Usually realist in style, these works assume the real world as their basis. Intrusion fantasies rely heavily on explanation and description. Immersive and portal fantasies may themselves host intrusions. Classic intrusion fantasies include the novel Dracula (1897) by Bram Stoker and the book Mary Poppins (1934) by P. L. Travers. In French-speaking countries, this genre is called fantastique and is considered to be distinct from fantasy.
Liminal fantasy
In liminal fantasy, the fantastic enters a world that appears to be our own. The marvelous is perceived as normal by the protagonists, while it disconcerts and estranges the reader. This is a relatively rare mode. Such fantasies often adopt an ironic, blasé tone, as opposed to the straight-faced mimesis more common in fantasy. Examples include Joan Aiken's stories about the Armitage family, who are amazed that unicorns appear on their lawn on a Tuesday, rather than a Monday.

== Subculture ==
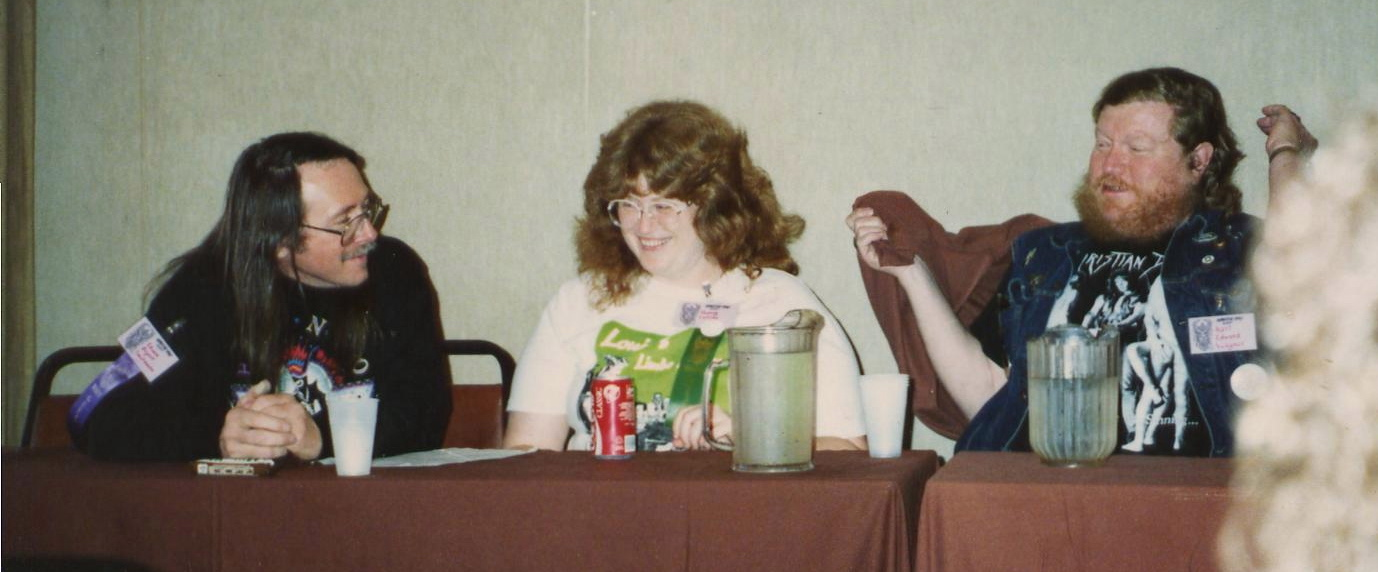
Fantasy writers on a panel at the World Fantasy Conference in Seattle, Washington, in 1989. From left to right: Ed Bryant, Nancy A. Collins, and Karl Edward Wagner.

Publishers, editors, authors, artists, and scholars who are interested in the fantasy genre meet annually at the World Fantasy Convention (WFC). The World Fantasy Awards are presented at this convention. The first WFC was held in 1975, and it has been held annually since that time (in a different city each year).

In addition, many science fiction conventions, such as Florida's FX Show and MegaCon, cater to fantasy and horror fans. Anime conventions, such as Ohayocon and Anime Expo, often feature showings of fantasy, science fantasy, and dark fantasy series and films; examples include Majutsushi Orphen (fantasy), Sailor Moon (urban fantasy), Berserk (dark fantasy), and Spirited Away (fantasy). Many science-fiction/fantasy and anime conventions also emphasize or cater to one or more of the subcultures within the main cultures:

- the cosplay subculture, in which people make or wear costumes based on existing or self-created characters, sometimes acting out skits or plays as well
- the fan fiction subculture
- the fan video or AMV subculture
- the large internet subculture, which is devoted to reading and writing prose fiction or doujinshi in or related to those genres

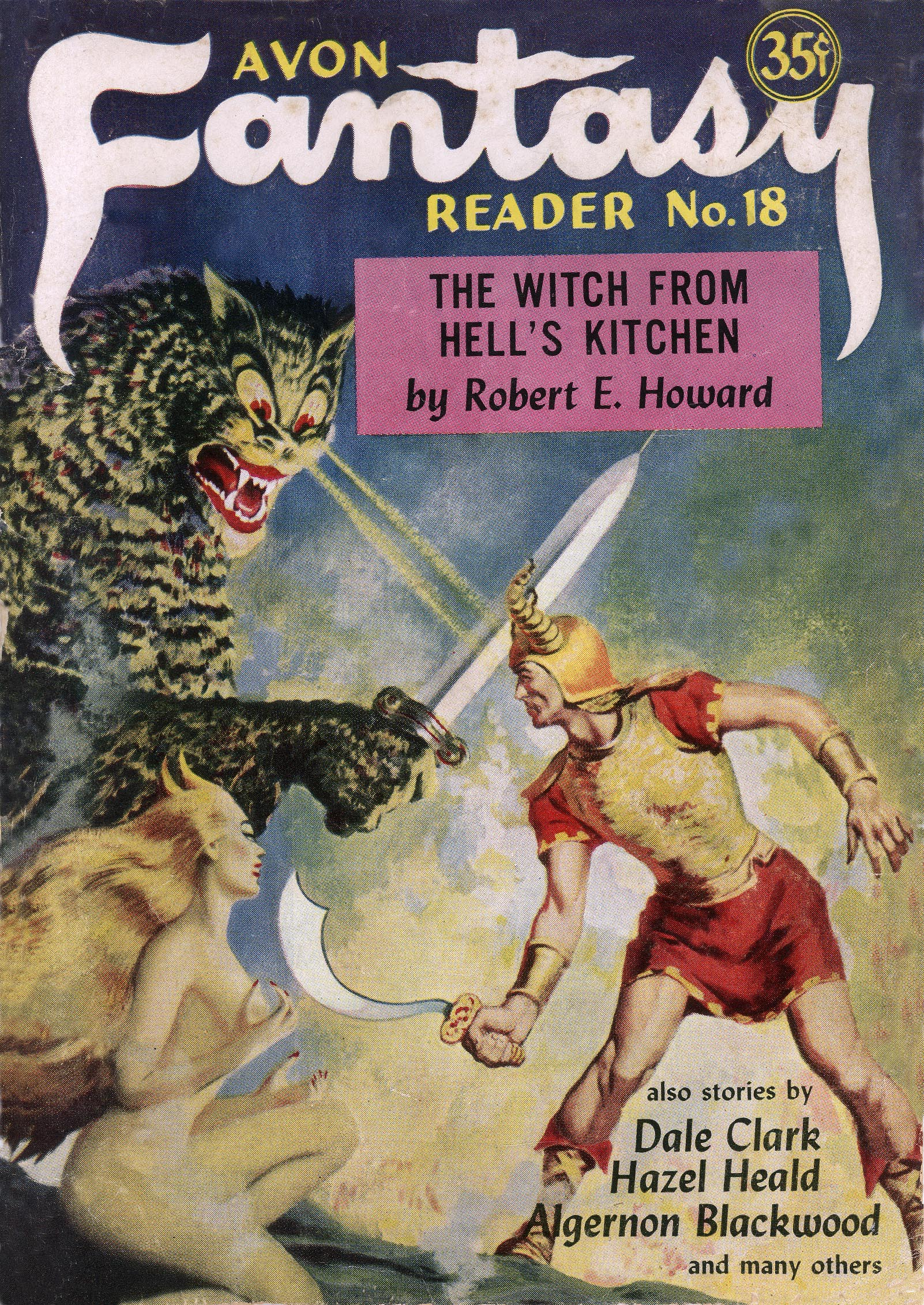
The cover of Avon Fantasy Reader magazine (number 18)

According to 2013 statistics from the fantasy publisher Tor Books, men outnumber women by 67% to 33% among writers of historical, epic or high fantasy. By contrast, among writers of urban fantasy or paranormal romance, 57% are women and 43% are men.

== Analysis ==
Fantasy is studied in a number of disciplines including English and other language studies, cultural studies, comparative literature, history, and medieval studies. Some works draw political, historical, and literary connections between medievalism and popular culture.

The French literary theorist Tzvetan Todorov argues that the fantastic is a liminal space, characterized by the intrusion of supernatural elements into the realistic framework of a story, accompanied by uncertainty about their existence. However, this precise definition is not predominant in English critical literature; the French term fantastique is used to differentiate the French concept from the broader English term fantastic, a synonym of fantasy. Todorov's restrictive definition and differences in national critical traditions have led to controversies such as the one initiated by Stanislaw Lem.

Rosemary Jackson builds on and also challenges Todorov's definition of the fantastic in her book Fantasy: The Literature of Subversion (1981). Jackson rejects the notion of the genre as a vessel for wish fulfillment that transcends human reality in worlds presented as superior to our own; instead she posits that the genre is inseparable from real life, particularly the social and cultural contexts in which each work of the genre is produced. She writes that the "unreal" elements of fantastic literature are created only in direct contrast to the boundaries set by its time period's "cultural order"; these elements act to illuminate the unseen limitations of these boundaries, by undoing and recompiling the structures that define society into something "strange" and "apparently new". In subverting these societal norms, Jackson claims, the fantastic represents an unspoken desire for greater societal change. Jackson criticizes Todorov's theory as being too limited in scope, examining only the literary function of the fantastic; she expands his structuralist theory to fit a more cultural study of the genre—which she proposes is not actually a genre, but a mode that draws upon literary elements of both realistic and supernatural fiction, to create an air of uncertainty in fantastic narratives as described by Todorov. Jackson also introduces the idea of reading the fantastic through a psychoanalytical lens, referring primarily to Freud's theory of the unconscious, which she believes is integral to understanding the fantastic's connection to the human psyche.

In their introduction to The Female Fantastic: Gender and the Supernatural in the 1890s and 1920s, Lizzie Harris McCormick, Jennifer Mitchell, and Rebecca Soares describe how the social climate in the 1890s and 1920s allowed for a new era of fantastic literature to develop. Women were exploring new freedoms and becoming more equal in society. Public fears about such women in society, together with women's expanded roles, allowed them to create a new style of fuzzy supernatural texts. The fantastic sits on the boundary between the supernatural and the mundane; this is analogous to how many women no longer respected a boundary of inequality that had been created for them. At the time, women's roles in society were uncertain; this is similar to how the rules of the fantastic genre are rarely straightforward. This climate allowed for a genre resembling the social structure to emerge, in which the fantastic is never purely supernatural, nor can the supernatural be entirely ruled out. (Similarly, women were not fully equal yet, nor were they completely oppressed.) The female fantastic seeks to reinforce the idea that nothing is certain in the fantastic genre nor in the gender roles of the 1920s. Many women began to blur the lines between genders, removing the binary aspect of gender and allowing for multiple interpretations. In a new way, women began to possess more masculine or queer qualities without encountering as much resistance. The fantastic genre reflects these new ideas by breaking analogous boundaries in the supernatural realm, so that readers never fully know whether the story is supernatural.

== Related genres ==
- Horror
- Science fantasy
- Science fiction
- Superhero fiction
- Supernatural fiction
- Afro-fantasy
- Utopian and dystopian fiction

== See also ==
- Fantasy literature
- Outline of fantasy
- List of fantasy authors
- Lists of fantasy novels
- List of fantasy worlds
- List of genres
- List of high fantasy fiction
- List of literary genres
- Fantastique
- Slavic fantasy
- Theosophical fiction
- Worldbuilding
