= Children's literature periodicals =

Children's literature periodicals include magazines about children's literature intended for adults, such as:

- Academic journals focusing on the scholarly study of children's and young adult literature
- Review journals reviewing specific works for children and young adults
- Library science and education journals discussing the selection and use of literature with children

Children's magazines, which are magazines intended for children, are not included in this category.

== Academic journals ==
- ALAN Review
- Bookbird: A Journal of International Children's Literature
- The Bulletin of the Center for Children's Books
- Children's Literature
- Children's Literature Association Quarterly
- The Lion and the Unicorn

== Review journals ==
- The Horn Book Magazine
- School Library Journal

The general purpose review journals Kirkus Reviews and Publishers Weekly also have established sections for reviewing children's and young adult books.

== Library science journals ==
- Young Adult Library Services

== Education journals ==
- Book Links
- English Journal
