= Marilyn Fain Apseloff =

American author

- Born: March 18, 1934; Attleboro, Massachusetts, U.S.
- Died: February 22, 2018 (aged 83)
- Occupation: Professor of English
- Spouse: Stanford S. Apseloff (m. 1956)
- Children: 4: Roy, Stanford, Glen, Lynn

Marilyn Fain Apseloff (March 18, 1934 - February 22, 2018) was an American author and a professor at Kent State University, known for her study of children's literature.

== Early life and education ==
Apseloff was born Marilyn Fain in 1934 in Attleboro, Massachusetts to Arthur and Eve Fain. Apseloff received her bachelor's degree from the University of Cincinnati in 1956, and her master's degree from the University of Cincinnati in 1957. She also completed a fellowship at the University of Cincinnati in 1957. Her formal introduction to children's literature began when her husband urged her to take a class at Kent State University, where he taught.

== Career ==
Apseloff became a teaching assistant for the Children's Literature class at Kent State, then a part-time instructor in 1969. After promotions to Assistant and Associate Professor in the English department, she became a full Professor in 1992.

Apseloff was among the early leadership of the Children's Literature Association (ChLA), founded in 1973 to provide a professional hub for scholarly study and criticism of children's literature, a field at that time in its infancy. She served on the association's board of directors from 1976 to 1985, as treasurer from 1976 to 1977, and president from 1979 to 1980. She was the chair of the organization's conference at Harvard University in 1979.

Apseloff attended the 1979 First White House Conference on Library and Information Services as the president of the Children's Literature Association and spoke before a Senate committee. She also presented a paper on the importance of child-specific services and literature, and the work the ChLA was doing in these areas.

Her writings discuss and analyze literature ranging from books for babies to adult poetry for children, and she wrote about controversial subjects in children's literature, including death, abandonment, war, and suicide. She also wrote analysis of children's novels and biographical essays about authors.

During her career, Apseloff served as a contributing editor of the Children’s Literature Quarterly from 1979-1982, then as a co-editor in 1983, and as an editor from 1984-1987. She taught and presented her work both nationally and internationally, including in Greece, Poland, and Lithuania. She also contributed her time to the Kent Free Public Library and local schools.

Much of Apseloff's scholarly writing concerned absurdist and nonsense literature for children. With Celia Catlett Anderson, she wrote Nonsense Literature for Children: Aesop to Seuss, which was chosen as a Book Award Honorable Mention by the Children's Literature Association in 1991. The book received positive reviews in both The School Library Journal, and the journal Emergency Librarian, and along with related articles continues to be cited by scholars who are extending knowledge in the field of children's literary criticism and those studying the works of Theodor Geisel, Lewis Carroll, and Edward Gorey.

Apseloff also studied the writings of authors whose primary audience is adults but who also created books for children, and works for adults that could be adapted for children. In addition to a number of articles on this topic, Apseloff wrote the book They Wrote for Children Too: An Annotated Bibliography of Children's Books by Famous Writers for Adults.

Apseloff's third book, Elizabeth George Speare, published in 1991, focused on the American writer and Newbery Medal winner's works for children, including The Witch of Blackbird Pond and The Sign of the Beaver.

Apseloff contributed articles entitled "Literature for Children" to the World Book Year Book every year from 1984 through 2004.

== Selected works ==
- "Literature for Children" The World Book Year Book (World Book, 1984-1997, 1999-2004)
- Nonsense Literature for Children: Aesop to Seuss, with Celia Catlett Anderson (Shoe String Press, 1989)
- They Wrote for Children Too: An annotated bibliography of children's books by famous writers for adults (Greenwood Press, 1989)
- Elizabeth George Speare. (Twayne Publishers, 1991)
- "Literature, Children's" The World Book Year Book (World Book, 1998)
- "Death Adolescent Literature: Suicide". Children's Literature Association Quarterly. 16: 4.
- Apseloff, Marilyn Fain (1992). "Abandonment: The New Realism of the Eighties". Children's Literature in Education. 23 (2): 101–106. doi:10.1007/BF01141847. S2CID 145005217.
- “Survival! Polish Children During World War II.” Visions of War: World War II in Popular Literature and Culture, edited by M. Paul Holsinger and Mary Anne. Schofield, Bowling Green State University Popular Press, 1992, pp. 78–84.
- Apseloff, Marilyn (Summer 1987). "Books for babies: Learning toys or pre-literature?". Children's Literature Association Quarterly. 12 (2): 63–66. doi:10.1353/chq.0.0382. S2CID 144534081.
