= Edward James (historian) =

British academic (born 1947)

Edward Frederick James (born 14 May 1947) is a British scholar of early medieval history, and science fiction. Edward James retired in 2012 and is Emeritus Professor of Medieval History at University College, Dublin.

== Awards ==
James received the Eaton Award for Science Fiction in the Twentieth Century (1994), the Pilgrim Award (2004) for lifetime contribution to SF and fantasy scholarship, and the Hugo Award for his non-fiction book The Cambridge Companion to Science Fiction (2005, co-edited with Farah Mendlesohn). In 2015 he won the British Science Fiction Association Award for the Loncon3 installation, 'Science Fiction Writers in the Great War'.

== Biography ==
James was born in Solihull, Warwickshire. He attended the Solihull School and read Modern History at St John's College, Oxford (1965-1968). He completed postgraduate work at the Institute of Archaeology, Oxford, 1968-1970, supervised by Professor Christopher Hawkes. James was awarded D.Phil in 1975, for a thesis entitled ‘South-West Gaul from the fifth to the eighth century: the contribution of archaeology’. He began teaching in 1970 at University College, Dublin.

He was a lecturer at the Department of Medieval History in University College Dublin from 1970 to 1978. He was a lecturer in early medieval history at the Department of History, University of York, 1978 to 1995, as well as Director of the Centre for Medieval Studies, University of York from 1990 to 1995. He was Professor of Medieval History at the University of Reading from 1995 to 2004 and was a Director of the Graduate Centre for Medieval Studies, 1999–2001. In 2004 he returned to University College Dublin as Professor of Medieval History at UCD from 2004 and served as head of the School of History and Archives 2010 to 2012. He retired in 2012.

Edward James has been an active member of British science fiction fandom since his mid-teens. James served as editor of Foundation: the International Journal of Science Fiction in 1986 to 2001, and then as production editor until 2007. In 1987-88 he was one of the first jurors of the Arthur C. Clarke Award. In 1995, along with Patrick Parrinder, he established the MA in Science Fiction at the University of Reading. He was a Guest of Honour at the 2013 Eastercon, 'Eightsquaredcon'.

== Publications ==
=== Medieval History ===
Europe’s Barbarians (Longman Pearson, Harlow, 2009), 344pp. (Italian translation as I Barbari, by Società Editrice Il Mulino, Bologna, 2011)

Britain in the First Millennium (Edward Arnold, London, 2001), 320pp.

The Franks (‘The Peoples of Europe’ series: Basil Blackwell, Oxford, 1988), 265pp. (Dutch translation, as De Franken, published by Ambo/Baarn, in 1990; Czech translation as Frankové, published by Nakladatelství, Lidové Noviny, 1997; Italian translation, as I Franchi. Agli Albori dell’Europa. Storia e Mito, published by Edizioni Culturali Internazionale Genova, Genoa 1998)

Gregory of Tours: Life of the Fathers (translation, introduction and commentary) (Translated Texts for Historians: University of Liverpool Press, 1985), 180pp (second revised edition published in 1991; second edition with new foreword, 30th Anniversary edition, 2015).

The Origins of France: from Clovis to the Capetians, AD 500-1000 (Macmillan, London, 1982), 253pp. Translation, as Les Origines de la France, published by Editions Errance, Paris, 1986, 271pp.

Ed. Visigothic Spain: New Approaches (Oxford University Press, 1980), 303pp.

The Merovingian Archaeology of South-West Gaul, 2 vols (British Archaeological Reports, Suppl. Series 25, Oxford, 1977), 529pp.

Our Ancient Heritage (Educational Company of Ireland, Dublin, 1977), 280pp.

Transl. (with Columba James): Lucien Musset, The Germanic Invasions: the Making of Europe AD 400-600 (Elek, London, 1975), xiii + 287pp.

=== Science Fiction and Fantasy ===
Lois McMaster Bujold (Modern Masters of Science Fiction) (Urbana, Chicago and Springfield: Illinois University Press, 2015), 203pp.

Ed., with Farah Mendlesohn, The Cambridge Companion to Fantasy Literature (Cambridge: Cambridge University Press, 2012), 268pp. Short-listed for a Hugo Award, Best Related Category, and for a Locus Award, Non-Fiction.

with Farah Mendlesohn, A Short History of Fantasy (London: Middlesex University Press, 2009; Libri Publishing, 2012), 285pp. Translated as Eine kurze Geschichte der Fantasy, by Simone Heller (Muncher: Golkonda, 2017), 328pp.

Ed., with Farah Mendlesohn, The Cambridge Companion to Science Fiction (Cambridge University Press, Cambridge, 2003), 295pp. Winner of the Hugo Award, Best Related Category, in 2005.

Ed., with Andrew M. Butler and Farah Mendlesohn, Terry Pratchett: Guilty of Literature (Science Fiction Foundation, Reading, 2000), 184pp. Short-listed for a Hugo Award, in the Best Related Category.

Ed., with Farah Mendlesohn, The Parliament of Dreams: Conferring on Babylon 5 (Science Fiction Foundation, Reading, 1998), 178pp.

Science Fiction in the Twentieth Century (Oxford University Press, Oxford, 1994), 250pp. Awarded the Eaton Award of the University of California, for the best critical work on sf.

Ed., with Maxim Jakubowski, The Profession of Science Fiction: SF Writers on their Craft and Ideas (Macmillan, London, 1992)

Index to Foundation 1-40 (North East London Polytechnic 1988), 108pp.

A full list of Edward James' publications can be found here.

== Recognition ==
James is the recipient of the 2004 Pilgrim Award for lifetime contribution to science fiction and fantasy scholarship. He has also won the Hugo Award for Best Related Work and a BSFA Award for Best Non-Fiction, and in 2017 the International Association of the Fantastic in the Arts Distinguished Scholar Award, in addition to multiple nominations for individual works.

Year (Note: Year of publication.)	Work	Award (Note: All awards and nominations are in their respective non-fiction categories: the Hugo Award for Best Related Work, the British Fantasy Award for Best Non-fiction, the BSFA Award for Best Non-Fiction and the Locus Award for Best Non-fiction.)	Result
1994	Science Fiction in the Twentieth Century	Eaton Award	Won
1994	Science Fiction in the Twentieth Century	Locus Award	Nominated
2000	Terry Pratchett: Guilty of Literature	Hugo Award for Best Related Work	Nominated
2003	The Cambridge Companion to Science Fiction	Hugo Award for Best Related Work	Won
2009	A Short History of Fantasy	BSFA Award for Best Non-Fiction	Nominated
2012	The Cambridge Companion to Fantasy Literature	British Fantasy Award	Nominated
2012	The Cambridge Companion to Fantasy Literature	BSFA Award for Best Non-Fiction	Nominated
2012	The Cambridge Companion to Fantasy Literature	Hugo Award for Best Related Work	Nominated
2012	The Cambridge Companion to Fantasy Literature	Locus Award	Nominated
2014	"Science Fiction and Fantasy Writers in the Great War"	BSFA Award for Best Non-Fiction	Won
2015	Lois McMaster Bujold	BSFA Award for Best Non-Fiction	Nominated

== Personal life ==
Married:

Columba James nee Maguire, 1967-1993.

Farah Mendlesohn in 2001.

== Selected works ==
- Visigothic Spain: New Approaches. Edited by James. Oxford: Clarendon Press; New York: Oxford University Press, 1980. (ISBN 0-198-22543-1)
- The Origins of France: From Clovis to the Capetians, 500–1000. New York: St. Martin's Press, 1982. ISBN 0-312-58862-3.
- The Franks. Oxford, UK: Blackwell, 1988. ISBN 0-631-14872-8.
- The Profession of Science Fiction: SF Writers on their Craft and Ideas. Edited by Maxim Jakubowski and James; foreword by Arthur C. Clarke. Insights series. Macmillan UK, 1992. ISBN 0-333-52482-9. New York: St. Martin's Press, 1992. (ISBN 0-312-08047-6. (Note: ISFDB catalogues a series, The Profession of Science Fiction, comprising 65 articles published from 1972 to 2007 in Foundation, the review James edited 1986 to 2001. Numbers 1 to 42 were published by 1990, number 43 in 1992. The articles are classified as essays (58, perhaps all by different writers), short fiction (one dated 1987), and interviews (six, all after 1992). ISFDB does not catalogue the contents of the 1992 book.)
- The Parliament of Dreams: Conferring on Babylon 5 (1998) edited by Edward James and Farah Mendlesohn. A PDF of this collection is available here.
- Science Fiction in the Twentieth Century. Oxford: Oxford University Press, 1994. ISBN 0-192-19263-9)
- The Cambridge Companion to Science Fiction. Edited by James and Farah Mendlesohn. Cambridge, U.K.: Cambridge University Press, 2003. ISBN 0-521-81626-2.
- Terry Pratchett: Guilty of Literature (2000) edited by Andrew M. Butler, Edward James and Farah Mendlesohn. Republished in a new edition in 2004 ISBN 978-1882968312 by Old Earth Books.
- Britain in the First Millennium. London: Oxford University Press, 2001. ISBN 0-340-58688-5.
- Europe's Barbarians, AD 200–600. Harlow, England: Pearson Longman, 2009. ISBN 0-582-77296-6.
- A Short History of Fantasy. Farah Mendlesohn and James. London: Middlesex University Press, 2009. ISBN 1-904-75068-0.
- The Cambridge Companion to Fantasy Literature. Edited by James and Farah Mendlesohn. Cambridge, U.K.: Cambridge University Press, 2012. ISBN 0-521-42959-5.
