= The Pocket Essentials =

A typical book cover from the series

The Pocket Essentials is a series of small, A6 sized books on various subjects. The publisher is also known as Pocket Essentials. Each book is written by a different author. The books have been credited with being full of rare information, though there are no pictures.

== Books in the series ==
Film directors
- Woody Allen
- Tim Burton
- Jane Campion
- John Carpenter
- Jackie Chan
- Coen Brothers
- David Cronenberg
- Clint Eastwood
- Terry Gilliam
- Hal Hartley
- Alfred Hitchcock
- Mike Hodges
- Krzysztof Kieslowski
- Stanley Kubrick
- Spike Lee
- Sergio Leone
- George Lucas
- David Lynch
- Michael Mann
- Brian De Palma
- Sam Peckinpah
- George A. Romero
- Martin Scorsese
- Steven Soderbergh
- Stephen Spielberg
- Oliver Stone
- Quentin Tarantino
- Orson Welles
- Billy Wilder

Film genres

- Blaxploitation Cinema
- Bollywood
- Carry On Films
- German Expressionism
- French New Wave
- Hammer Films
- Horror Films
- Science Fiction Films
- Slasher Movies
- Spaghetti Westerns
- Vampire Films
- Vietnam War Movies

Film subjects

- Animation
- Great British Movies
- Jackie Chan
- Filming on a Microbudget
- Film Music
- Film Studios
- Audrey Hepburn
- Laurel and Hardy
- Bruce Lee
- Marx Brothers
- Steve McQueen
- Marilyn Monroe
- The Oscars
- Writing a Screenplay

History

- Alchemy & Alchemists
- American Civil War
- Ancient Greece
- The Black Death
- The Crusades
- English Civil War
- Globalisation
- American Indian Wars
- Jack the Ripper
- Who Shot JFK?
- Nazi War Trials
- Nelson
- The Rise of New Labour
- Occult London
- Witchcraft

Miscellaneous

- How to Succeed as a Sports Agent
- Robert Crumb
- Doctor Who
- The Simpsons
- Stock Market Essentials
- The Universe
- Urban Legends
- Videogaming

Ideas

- Alchemy and Alchemists
- Bisexuality
- Conspiracy theories
- Feminism
- Freemasonry
- Freud and Psychoanalysis
- The Gnostics
- Holy Grail
- Nietzsche
- Postmodernism
- Psychogeography
- Saints
- UFOs
- Utopia

Literature

- Agatha Christie
- American Noir
- The Beat Generation
- Creative Writing
- Cyberpunk
- Philip K. Dick
- Historical Noir
- Hitchhiker's Guide
- Literary Theory
- London Writing
- Noir Fiction
- Nordic Noir
- Sherlock Holmes
- Alan Moore
- Terry Pratchett
- William Shakespeare
- Georges Simenon
- Tintin

Music

- Beastie Boys
- The Beatles
- Film Music
- How to Succeed in the Music Business
- The Madchester Scene
- Bruce Springsteen
- Jethro Tull
