= Children's Literature Association Quarterly =

- Discipline: Children's literature
- Language: English

Publication details
- History: 1975-present
- Publisher: Johns Hopkins University Press for the Children's Literature Association (United States)
- Frequency: Quarterly

Standard abbreviations
- ISO 4: Child.'s Lit. Assoc. Q.

Indexing
- ISSN: 0885-0429 (print); 1553-1201 (web)
- OCLC no.: 56715899

Links
- Journal homepage; Online access

Children's Literature Association Quarterly is a quarterly academic journal established in 1975 and is published by Johns Hopkins University Press. It is available to members of the Children's Literature Association as a membership benefit.

The journal promotes a scholarly approach to the study of children's literature by printing theoretical articles and essays, as well as book reviews.

== See also ==
- Children's literature criticism
- Children's literature periodicals
