= Pornokitsch =

British "geek culture" blog

- Logo
- Website type: "Geek culture" blog
- Available in: English
- Owners: Anne C. Perry & Jared Shurin
- Creator: Various
- Editors: Anne C. Perry & Jared Shurin
- Website: www.pornokitsch.com
- Commercial: No
- Registration: None
- Launched: 2008; 18 years ago
- Current status: Closed for new content as of March 31, 2018; 8 years ago

Pornokitsch was a British "geek culture" blog that published reviews and news concerning speculative fiction and other genre fiction.

== History ==
The website, established in 2008, is owned and edited by Anne C. Perry and Jared Shurin. Other contributors include authors Becky Chambers, Kuzhali Manickavel, Erin Lindsey, Mahvesh Murad and Molly Tanzer, and previous contributors have included Rebecca Levene, David Bryher, Jesse Bullington, Joey Hi-Fi, Jon Morgan and other sci-fi and speculative fiction writers.

The name of the website, a portmanteau of pornography and kitsch, is due to the "disposable and forgettable" nature of pornography mirroring the general reception of genre fiction, which is often seen as "the kitsch of the literary world".

In February 2018, Pornokitsch announced that it would end publication by the end of March. The website is to remain accessible.

=== The Kitschies ===
From 2009 to 2013, the website organized the annual Kitschies award ceremony for "the year's most progressive, intelligent and entertaining works that contain elements of the speculative or fantastic". The awards are given in three categories; the "Red Tentacle" for best novel; the "Golden Tentacle" for best début; and the "Inky Tentacle" for best cover art. From 2011 to 2013 it was sponsored by The Kraken Rum, who provide the £2,000 prize money and some bottles for prizes. The prize has continued independently of Pornokitsch, and is now sponsored by the booksellers Blackwell UK.

=== Jurassic London ===
Pornokitsch started a small non-profit publisher in 2011 named Jurassic London, commissioning anthologies of original work based around "contemporary, relevant topics".

== Awards ==
Pornokitsch was shortlisted for the 2011 BSFA Award for Best Non-Fiction and the 2014 Hugo Award for Best Fanzine. The site won the 2013 British Fantasy Award for best non-fiction.
