= Farah Mendlesohn =

British academic historian and writer

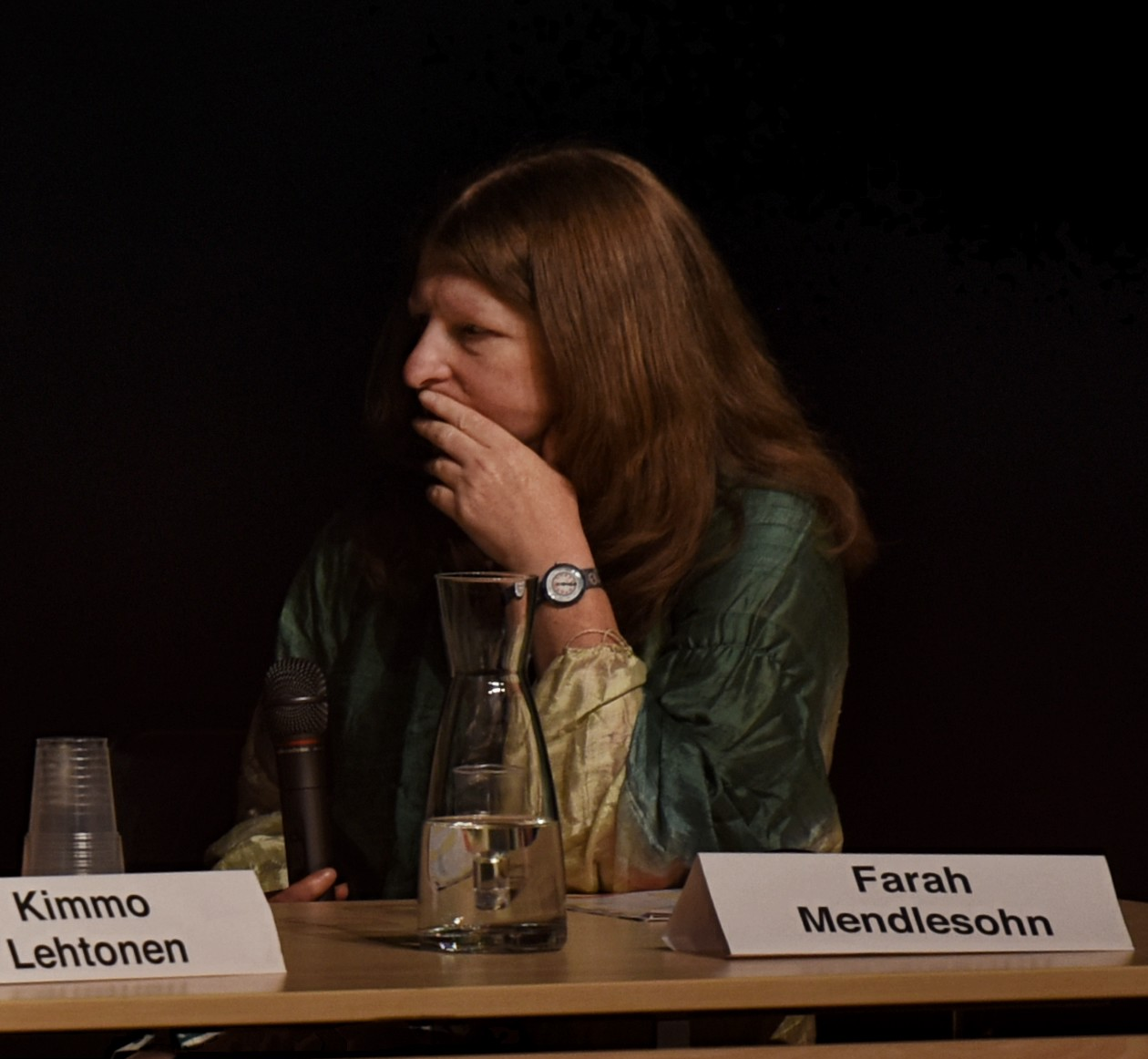
- Mendlesohn at Archipelacon in Mariehamn, 2015
- Born: 27 July 1968 (age 58); Manchester, England
- Citizenship: United Kingdom
- Occupations: Academic, writer
- Spouse: Edward James (m. 2001)
- Writing career
- Subjects: Cultural history, science fiction

Farah Jane Mendlesohn (born 27 July 1968) is a British academic historian, writer on speculative fiction, and active member of science fiction fandom. Mendlesohn is best-known for their book Rhetorics of Fantasy (2008), which classifies fantasy literature into four modes based on how the fantastic enters the story. Their work as editor includes the Cambridge Companions to science fiction and fantasy, collaborations with Edward James. The science fiction volume won a Hugo Award in 2005. Mendlesohn is also known for books on the history of fantasy, including Children's Fantasy Literature: An Introduction, co-written with Michael Levy. It was the first work to trace the genre's 500-year history and won the World Fantasy Award in 2017.

Mendlesohn's academic positions have included a professorship at Anglia Ruskin University; Mendlesohn has served as editor and chair of the science fiction journal Foundation, and as the president of the International Association for the Fantastic in the Arts. In 2015, Mendlesohn received the SFRA's Clareson award for distinguished service to the science fiction field.

== Scholarly career ==
Farah Jane Mendlesohn was born on 27 July 1968 in Manchester, England. Mendlesohn received a D. Phil. in history from the University of York in 1997. Mendlesohn's academic positions include a stint as reader in science fiction and fantasy literature in the media department at Middlesex University, and as professor and head of department in the department of English, communication, film and media at Anglia Ruskin University from 2012 to 2017. Mendlesohn joined Staffordshire University in November 2016 as professor and assistant dean in law, policing, forensics & sociology, and is now an associate fellow of the Anglia Ruskin Centre for Science Fiction and Fantasy.

Mendlesohn writes on the history of American religions and British and American science fiction and fantasy. Mendlesohn was the editor of Foundation - The International Review of Science Fiction from 2002 to 2007, and served as its chair from 2004. Mendlesohn then served as president of the International Association for the Fantastic in the Arts from 2008 to 2010. Mendlesohn used to be reviews editor of Quaker Studies.

Mendlesohn's best known work is the 2008 non-fiction book Rhetorics of Fantasy. It proposes a classification of the fantasy genre using the manner in which the fantastic interacts with the real world. The four modes, or "rhetorics", Mendlesohn proposes are: portal-quest fantasy, where the protagonists travel from our world to a fantastical one; immersive fantasy, where only the fantastical world exists; intrusion fantasy, where the barriers between the fantasy and real worlds break down; and liminal fantasy, set in a world where certain elements are seen as irrational by the reader but are unquestioned by the characters.

In 2016 Mendlesohn wrote Children's Fantasy Literature: An Introduction with collaborator Michael Levy. The book traces the development of children's fantasy from the 16th to the 21st centuries, covering events such as the collection of folk tales, the impact of world wars, and the emergence of young adult fiction. It was the first work to blend the history of the fantasy and children's literature fields.

In 2016 Mendlesohn established the Historical Fictions Research Network with colleagues Nina Lubbren and Jennifer Young. It aims to create a place for discussion of historical narratives across a range of disciplines.

== Awards and nominations ==
In 2005, Mendlesohn won the Hugo Award for Best Related Work for The Cambridge Companion to Science Fiction, which Mendlesohn edited with historian Edward James. James and Mendlesohn also edited The Cambridge Companion to Fantasy Literature, released in 2012, and wrote A Short History of Fantasy in 2009. Mendlesohn's book Rhetorics of Fantasy won the BSFA award for best non-fiction book in 2009; the book was also nominated for Hugo and World Fantasy Awards.

In 2010, Mendlesohn was nominated twice for the Best Related Work Hugo, for The Inter-Galactic Playground: A Critical Study of Children's and Teens' Science Fiction, and for On Joanna Russ. Mendlesohn received the Science Fiction Research Association's Clareson award for distinguished service in 2015.

In 2017, Mendlesohn won the World Fantasy Special Award—Professional for Children's Fantasy Literature: An Introduction. Their critical biography of Robert Heinlein (see below) was nominated for the Best Related Work Hugo in 2020. It won the BSFA Award for non-fiction, making them the only writer to have won this award three times.

== Science fiction conventions ==
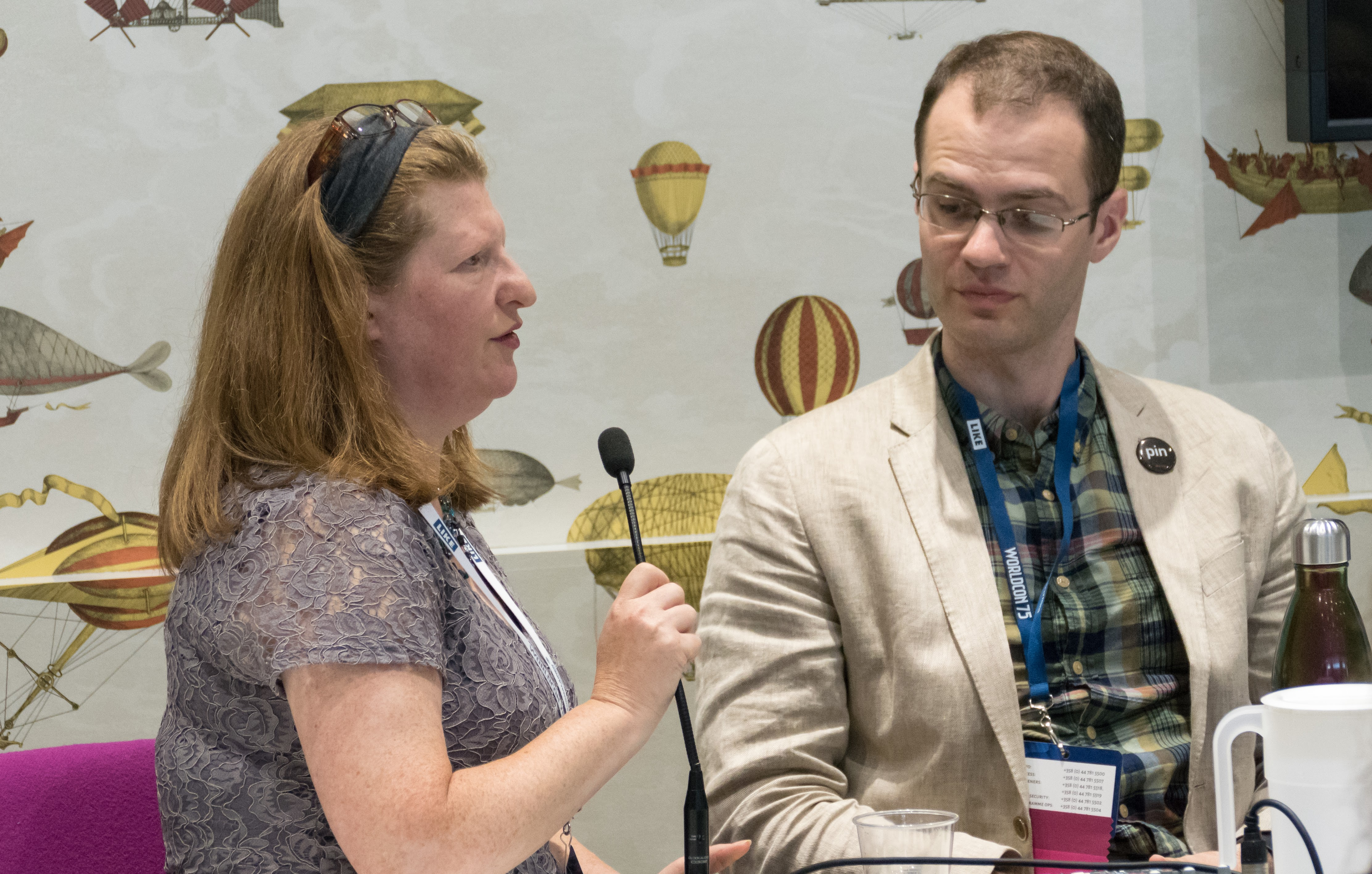
Farah Mendlesohn and author Max Gladstone at Worldcon Helsinki, 2017

Mendlesohn is an active volunteer member of the administration for science fiction conventions. Among other events, Mendlesohn co-chaired ConCussion, the 2006 Eastercon, with Simon Bradshaw; and was director of program for Anticipation, the Montreal World Science Fiction Convention, in 2009; Mendlesohn was on the convention committee of Loncon 3, the 72nd World Science Fiction Convention, but resigned as a protest over the announcement that Jonathan Ross was to be master of ceremonies for the presentation of the Hugo Awards; Mendlesohn remained division head for the convention's exhibits hall.

== Heinlein study ==
In 2017, Mendlesohn announced that a critical study of Robert Heinlein was to be published by the crowdfunding publisher Unbound. As of October 2017 the pledges had exceeded the target by 18%. The book was published in 2019, under the title The Pleasant Profession of Robert A. Heinlein.

== Selected works ==
As author

- Quaker Relief Work in the Spanish Civil War (Lewiston, N.Y.: Edwin Mellen Press, 2002)
- Diana Wynne Jones: Children's Literature and the Fantastic Tradition (Oxford: Routledge, 2005)
- Rhetorics of Fantasy (Middletown, CT: Wesleyan University Press, 2008)
- The Inter-galactic Playground: A Critical Study of Children's and Teens' Science Fiction (Jefferson, NC: McFarland, 2009). ISBN 9780786435036
- A Short History of Fantasy (London: Middlesex University Press, 2009) with Edward James
- Children's Fantasy Literature: An Introduction (London: Cambridge University Press, 2016) with Michael Levy
- The Pleasant Profession of Robert A. Heinlein (Unbound, 2019)
- Creating Memory: Historical Fiction and the English Civil Wars (Palgrave Macmillan, 2020)

As editor

- The Parliament of Dreams: Conferring on Babylon 5 (Reading: Science Fiction Foundation, 1998) with Edward James
- The True Knowledge of Ken MacLeod (Reading: Science Fiction Foundation, 2003) with Andrew Butler
- The Cambridge Companion to Science Fiction (Cambridge: Cambridge University Press, 2003) with Edward James
- Polder: A Festschrift For John Clute and Judith Clute (Baltimore: Old Earth Books, 2006)
- Glorifying Terrorism, Manufacturing Contempt: An Anthology of Original Science Fiction (London: Rackstraw Press, 2006)
- On Joanna Russ (Middletown, CT: Wesleyan University Press, 2009)
- The Cambridge Companion to Fantasy Literature (Cambridge: Cambridge University Press, 2012) with Edward James
- Classic Fantasy Stories (Macmillan, 2024)

== Source ==
- Greenwell, Amanda M. (2017). "[Review:] Michael Levy and Farah Mendlesohn. Children's Fantasy Literature: An Introduction". The Lion and the Unicorn. 41 (3): 404–406. doi:10.1353/uni.2017.0034. S2CID 148802842.
- McClelland, Joli Barham (2016). "[Review:] Children's Fantasy Literature: An Introduction by Michael Levy and Farah Mendlesohn". Children's Literature Association Quarterly. 41 (4): 458–460. doi:10.1353/chq.2016.0053. S2CID 151713806.
- Sawyer, Andy (2009). "[Review:] Farah Mendlesohn. Rhetorics of Fantasy". Utopian Studies. 20 (1): 175–179. doi:10.5325/utopianstudies.20.1.0175. JSTOR 20719935. S2CID 246648198.
