= Children's Literature (journal) =

- Discipline: Children's literature
- Language: English
- Edited by: Michelle Ann Abate, Julie Pfeiffer

Publication details
- History: 1972-present
- Publisher: Johns Hopkins University Press (United States)
- Frequency: Annually

Standard abbreviations
- ISO 4: Child.'s Lit.

Indexing
- ISSN: 0092-8208 (print); 1543-3374 (web)
- OCLC no.: 51540302

Links
- Journal homepage; Online access

Children's Literature is an academic journal and annual publication of the Modern Language Association and the Children's Literature Association Division on Children's Literature. The journal was founded in 1972 by Francelia Butler and promotes a scholarly approach to the study of children's literature by printing theoretical articles and essays, as well as book reviews. The publication is currently edited by Amanda Cockrell, of Hollins University in Roanoke, Virginia. The current editor in chief is R. H. W. Dillard.

Children's Literature is published annually in May by the Johns Hopkins University Press. Each issue has an average length of 300 pages.

== See also ==
- Children's literature criticism
- Children's literature periodicals
