= The Lion and the Unicorn (journal) =

- Discipline: Children's literature
- Language: English

Publication details
- History: 1977-present
- Publisher: Johns Hopkins University Press (United States)
- Frequency: Triannually

Standard abbreviations
- ISO 4: Lion Unic.

Indexing
- ISSN: 0147-2593 (print); 1080-6563 (web)
- OCLC no.: 31871270

Links
- Journal homepage; Online access

The Lion and the Unicorn is an academic journal founded in 1977. It examines children's literature from a scholarly perspective covering the publishing industry, regional authors, comparative studies, illustration, popular culture, and other topics. It provides unique author and editor interviews and a highly regarded book review section. The journal frequently takes the form of special themed issues.

The journal is published three times each year in January, April, and September by the Johns Hopkins University Press. Circulation is 686 and the average length of an issue is 160 pages. The title of the journal was inspired from a scene in the 1871 book Through the Looking-Glass.

As of September 2025 the last issue published was Volume 48, Number 1, January 2024.

== See also ==
- Children's literature periodicals
- Children's literature criticism
