= Children's literature criticism =

Criticism of children's literature

The term children's literature criticism includes both generalist discussions of the relationship between children's literature and literary theory and literary analyses of specific works of children's literature. Some academics consider young adult literature to be included under the rubric of 'children's literature.'

Nearly every school of theoretical thought has been applied to children's literature, most commonly reader response (Chambers 1980) and new criticism. However, other schools have been applied in controversial and influential ways, including Orientalism (Nodelman 1992), feminist theory (Paul 1987), postmodernism (Stevenson 1994), structuralism (Neumeyer 1977), post-structuralism (Rose, 1984, Lesnik-Oberstein, 1994) and many others.

== Approaches ==
=== Child focused ===
Early children's literature critics aimed to learn how children read literature specifically (rather than the mechanics of reading itself) so that they could recommend "good books" for children. These early critics were often teachers, librarians and other educationalists. The critics often disagreed about what books they think children would like, and why, and about which books will be "good" for children and why. Though many critics are still child-centric, the discipline has expanded to include other modes of analysis. As children's literature criticism started developing as an academic discipline (roughly in the past thirty years or so, see historical overviews by Hunt (1991) and McGillis (1997)), children's literature criticism became involved with wider work in literary theory and cultural studies.

==== Construction of the child ====
Many children's literature critics now point out that children are not one group, but differ according to gender, ethnicity, religious background, and so on. Feminist children's literature critics such as Lissa Paul (1987) therefore try to work out how boys and girls read differently, for instance. Numerous scholars have maintained that children's literature supports the reinforcement of traditional gender roles. In his research on gender norms in children's literature, sociology professor Frank Taylor asserts that children's books impart cultural values, including gender roles, which subsequently influence children to internalize gender norms. Taylor draws on earlier research in the field, citing studies from the 1970s that demonstrated that in critically acclaimed children's books male characters were depicted as active figures with leadership skills, whereas female characters were portrayed as more passive. Researchers including Danielle Clode and Shari Argent make complementary claims, stating that historical patterns of gender portrayal are prevalent in children's literature. Similarly, Sharyl Peterson and Mary Alyce Lach state that gender stereotypes present in children's literature influence “self-concept, potential for achievement, and perceptions of others.” Numerous studies have supported these claims. For example, one 2022 study conducted by Molly Lewis at Carnegie Mellon University analyzed 247 popular children's books using machine learning and concluded that “children's books may be an early source of gender associations and stereotypes”. Specifically, the study found that both the vocabulary used in children's books and the broader associations in the stories reinforced gender stereotypes.Other critics (for instance, Peter Hunt (1991), Perry Nodelman (1992), John Stephens (1992), and Roderick McGillis (1996)) take this idea a step further and argue that children are often "colonized" by adults, including children's literature critics, because adults speak on behalf of children instead of letting children express themselves. However, these critics too can not agree on what then are "true" children expressing themselves, and which books are therefore "good" for them. Finally, a few critics, notably Jacqueline Rose (1984) and Karin Lesnik-Oberstein (1994 and 2004) take this discussion even further, arguing that identities are created and not "inherent", and that in the case of an identity such as "childhood" it is created by "adults" in the light of their own perceptions of themselves. That is, "adulthood" defines "childhood" in relation to differences and similarities it perceives to itself. This post-structuralist approach is similar to that argued by critics in gender studies such as Judith Butler and is widely accepted and used in sociological and anthropological studies of childhood (Jenks 1996; Jenks, James and Prout 1997).

=== Textual focus ===
Many scholars approach children's literature from the perspective of literary studies, examining the text as text without focus on audience. Stephens and McCallum (1998) discuss the intertextuality of children's literature, while Rose explores the identifying characteristics of the genre. Nodelman (1990) looks at the synthesis of text and illustration in picturebooks.

=== Cultural studies focus ===
Culture studies scholars investigate children's literature as an aspect of culture. Children's literature, in this light, is a product consumed like other aspects of children's culture: video games, television, and the like. For more analysis of children's culture in general, see Jenkins. For literature in particular as cultural artifact, see Mackey.

== See also ==
- Children's literature
- Children's literature periodicals
