= Cultural Studies (journal) =

Academic journal

- Discipline: Cultural studies
- Language: English
- Edited by: Ted Striphas

Publication details
- Former name: Australian Journal of Cultural Studies (1983–1987)
- History: 1983–present
- Publisher: Routledge
- Frequency: Bimonthly
- Impact factor: 0.526 (2012)

Standard abbreviations
- ISO 4: Cult. Stud.

Indexing
- CODEN: CUSTE9
- ISSN: 0950-2386 (print); 1466-4348 (web)
- LCCN: 96640065
- OCLC no.: 488566197

Links
- Journal homepage; Online access; Online archive

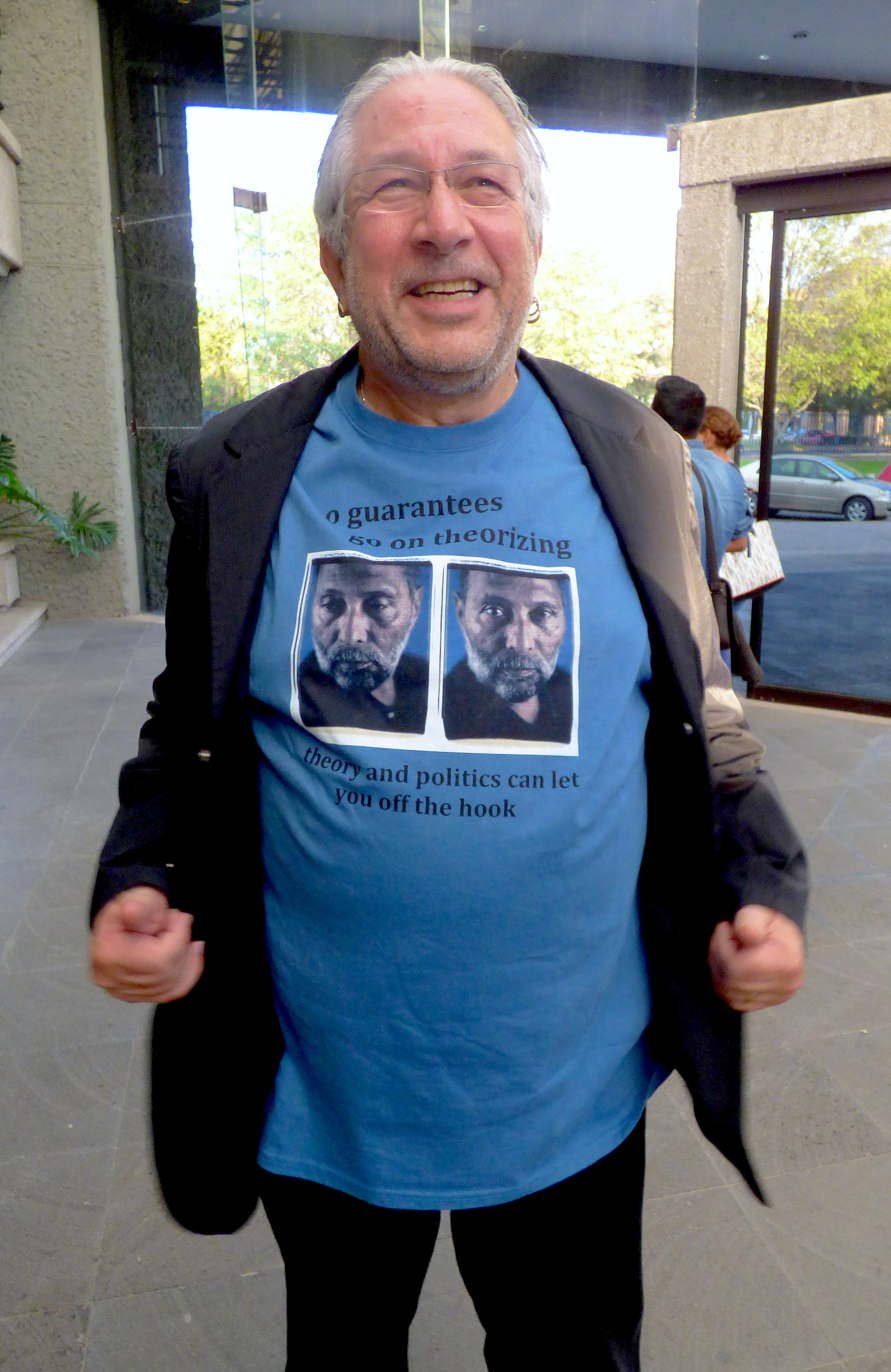
Lawrence Grossberg

Cultural Studies is a bimonthly peer-reviewed academic journal covering research on the relation between cultural practices, everyday life, material, economic, political, geographical, and historical contexts. The current editor-in-chief is Ted Striphas (University of Colorado Boulder). Lawrence Grossberg (University of North Carolina), who has served as editor-in-chief from 1990 until 2018 is currently involved as Editor Emeritus. Former co-editors include Janice Radway (1991–1995) and Della Pollock (1995–2013).

Cultural Studies was preceded by the Australian Journal of Cultural Studies, which began in 1983 and was first published at the Western Australian Institute of Technology, under the initial leadership of John Fiske, who served as general editor. The journal was established under its current name in 1987. Originally published by Methuen Publishing, it transferred to Routledge when the Methuen imprint was sold by then-owner International Thomson Organization to Octopus Publishing.

== Abstracting and indexing ==
The journal is abstracted and indexed in

- Arts & Humanities Citation Index
- Applied Social Science Index and Abstracts
- British Humanities Index
- CSA Worldwide Political Science Abstracts
- Current Contents/Social & Behavioural Sciences
- International Bibliography of the Social Sciences
- Social Sciences Citation Index
- Scopus
- Sociological Abstracts

According to the Journal Citation Reports, the journal had a 2012 impact factor of 0.526.
