= Politics of Harry Potter =

Politics of the Harry Potter books by J. K. Rowling

There are many published theories about the politics of the Harry Potter novels by J. K. Rowling, which range from them containing criticism of racism to anti-government sentiment. The books have been argued to contain both liberal and conservative themes and viewpoints. According to Inside Higher Ed, doctoral theses have been devoted to the Harry Potter books. There are also several university courses centred on analysis of the Potter series, including an upper division political science course.

Time magazine noted the political and social aspects of Harry Potter in their 2007 Person of the Year issue, where Rowling placed third behind politicians Vladimir Putin and Al Gore. Harry Potter's potential social and political impact was called similar to the 19th-century phenomenon of Harriet Beecher Stowe's popular, but critically maligned, book, Uncle Tom's Cabin, which fuelled the abolitionist movement leading up to the American Civil War.

When asked about the politics and message in Harry Potter, Rowling explained, "I wanted Harry to leave our world and find exactly the same problems in the wizarding world. So you have the intent to impose a hierarchy, you have bigotry, and this notion of purity, which is this great fallacy, but it crops up all over the world. People like to think themselves superior and that if they can pride themselves in nothing else they can pride themselves on perceived purity. [...] It wasn't really exclusively that. I think you can see in the Ministry even before it's taken over, there are parallels to regimes we all know and love." She also said, "You should question authority and you should not assume that the establishment or the press tells you all of the truth."

The Wall Street Journal compared Neville Chamberlain to Rowling's Cornelius Fudge, saying both were eager to help their constituents look the other way to avoid war. "Throughout the '30s, Chamberlain, fearing that Churchill was out for his job, conducted a campaign against his fellow Tory. Chamberlain tried evading war with Germany, and ridiculed Churchill as a 'warmonger'. He used The Times—the government's house organ—to attack Churchill and suppress dispatches from abroad about the Nazis that would have vindicated him." Rowling confirmed Chamberlain was her inspiration in the Spanish newspaper magazine XLSemanal.

Rowling also told the Dutch newspaper de Volkskrant that Voldemort was modelled on Hitler and Stalin, as a megalomaniac and paranoid figure, and that she was influenced by the Second World War, which is "anchored in all our minds". Discussing Draco Malfoy, she claimed, "Draco Malfoy does indeed stand for that type of boy. He wouldn't have killed Dumbledore, he couldn't. As long as things are imaginary, okay, but once it becomes reality, the thing becomes more difficult." She also stated, "No, that I gave him that light blonde hair is not because I wanted to make him into a scary Nazi. You give your characters the appearance that you find attractive; that is why I gave my hero dark hair, green eyes and glasses. I'm married to a man who looks like that."

== Overview ==
Barratt's The Politics of Harry Potter (2012) argues that the Harry Potter books, while ostensibly fantasy, engage with real-world political issues and ideologies. Rowling explained, "I wanted Harry to leave our world and find exactly the same problems in the wizarding world.” Barratt finds that the works explore a wide range of real world issues which include:

- Authoritarianism and fascism: A central theme Barratt identifies is the series' clear condemnation of authoritarianism and fascist policies, embodied by Lord Voldemort and his Death Eaters. The books depict the dangers of pure-blood supremacy, discrimination, and the suppression of dissent, drawing parallels with historical and contemporary examples of totalitarian regimes.
- Liberal democracy: Her books champion democratic values such as equality, tolerance, free speech, and the rule of law. The struggle against Voldemort is presented as a fight to preserve these values against those who seek to destroy them. The importance of institutions and fair processes is also highlighted, though not without acknowledging their flaws.
- Social inequality and prejudice: Rowling's books address issues of social inequality and prejudice, particularly through the treatment of house-elves, werewolves, and other marginalised groups. The series critiques prejudice based on blood status of humans and inter-species prejudice.
- The importance of resistance and activism: Barrett shows how Rowling emphasises the importance of resistance against tyranny and injustice. The characters in the series, particularly Harry and his friends, demonstrate the power of individual and collective action in challenging oppressive forces.

The books examine the basis of power, the control of information and the role of the media and explore themes of justice and punishment.

Some of the themes in the books are presented more ambiguously. For example, the Ministry of Magic is both bumbling, inefficient and corrupt, but also inhabited by key players, and with a layer of necessary legitimacy. This reflects a more nuanced understanding of real world power structures.

== Racism and totalitarianism ==
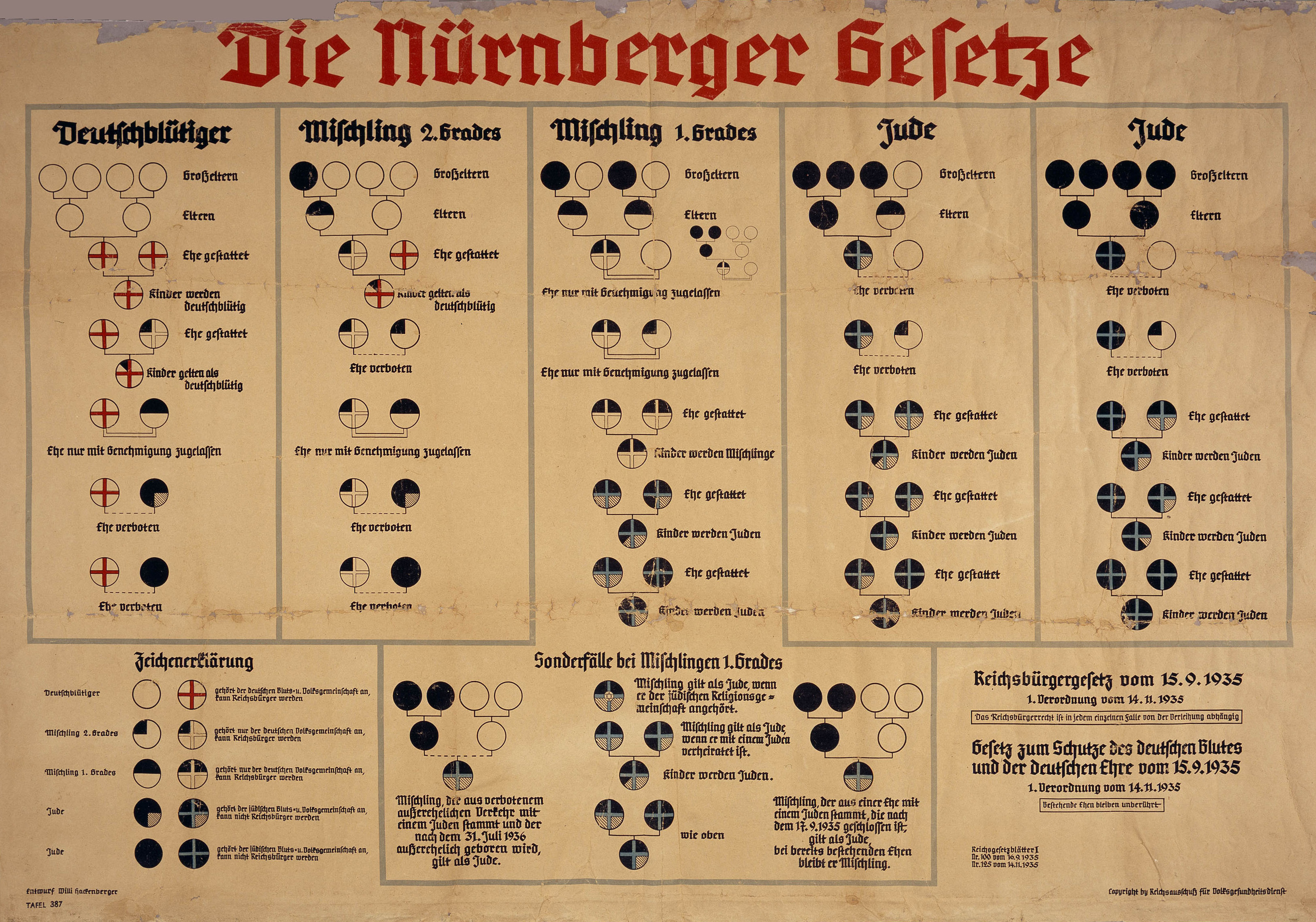
The "pure-blood", "half-blood" and "Mudblood"/"Muggle-born" divisions used in Harry Potter are redolent of the system distinguishing Jews, Germans, "mixed blood: first degree" and "mixed blood: second degree" in Nazi Germany, as in this chart.

Timothy Snyder in his book On Tyranny recommends reading The Deathly Hallows for its anti-totalitarianism in addition to classics from authors like George Orwell.

Analysts note the criticism of racism in J. K. Rowling's texts. When asked about the theme of racism and if her books have changed how people think, Rowling said, "I do not think I am pessimistic but I think I am realistic about how much you can change deeply entrenched prejudice, so my feeling would be that if someone were a committed racist, possibly Harry Potter is not going to have an effect."

After the publication of Deathly Hallows, Rowling responded to queries about metaphors in the books for ethnic cleansing: "Well, it is a political metaphor. But... I didn't sit down and think, 'I want to recreate Nazi Germany', in the—in the wizarding world. Because—although there are—quite consciously overtones of Nazi Germany, there are also associations with other political situations. So I can't really single one out." Rowling also compared her character Voldemort to paranoid megalomaniacs like Adolf Hitler and Joseph Stalin.

Rowling stated on her website that the Harry Potter phrases 'pure-blood', 'half-blood' and 'Muggle-born' compared to "some of the real charts the Nazis used to show what constituted 'Aryan' or 'Jewish' blood. I saw one in the Holocaust Museum in Washington when I had already devised the 'pure-blood', 'half-blood' and 'Muggle-born' definitions, and was chilled to notice the similarity."

Some commentators suggested that the portrayal of goblins in the books is modelled on anti-Semitism. In an article in the magazine Moment, Stephen Richer rejects this, noting that Rowling borrows a wide range of fantasy tropes, and saying, "Perhaps the goblin character has its origins in anti-Semitism, but Rowling can hardly be convicted of unjust commentary for using a now-familiar Western literary character." He points out that a deliberate anti-semitism would be at odds with Rowling's stated views and the themes of the books.

Aviva Chomsky (daughter of Noam Chomsky) in The Providence Journal suggests that Harry Potter is a parable on immigration rights, noting that US "immigration, citizenship and naturalization laws are based explicitly on discrimination on the basis of national origin. Where you were born, and what passport you carry, determine whether you have the right to come here, to visit, to work, or to live here."

== Education versus indoctrination ==
Entertainment Weekly noted that the post-9/11 generation's "ideas about war, about leadership, about the dangers of consolidation of power and of dictatorship, about the importance of dissent, and about heroism and sacrifice, have been shaped at least in part by Rowling," and that their concept of freedom of speech has been influenced by Rowling's weathering of her books' everyday challenges.

Bill O'Reilly joined in the political fray over Harry Potter character Albus Dumbledore's outing by asking if it was part of a "gay agenda" to indoctrinate children. He called J. K. Rowling a provocateur for telling fans about Dumbledore's sexuality after the books were written. His guest, Entertainment Weekly Senior Editor Tina Jordan, called his "indoctrination" claims "a shallow argument", saying "indoctrination is a very strong word" because "we all know gay people, whether we know it or not." O'Reilly continued the following day, saying that the real problem was that Rowling was teaching "tolerance" and "parity for homosexuals with heterosexuals". His guest, Dennis Miller, said that tolerance was good and didn't think you could indoctrinate a child into being gay.

Zenit, a news agency dedicated to promoting the message of the Catholic Church, accused Rowling of betraying her readers by disclosing Dumbledore's sexuality and said that Rowling was the wealthiest woman in Britain thanks to the lack of political, social, or moral propaganda in her books. An op-ed said that one parent's perception of indoctrination was another's education, countering charges that Rowling promoted homosexuality in her books. Discussing the controversy, Rowling told the BBC that "Christian fundamentalists were never my base" and thought it ridiculous to question if a gay person could be a moral compass in the 21st century.

Discussing the values and morality of her characters Draco and Dudley, Rowling explained that both were indoctrinated with their parent's beliefs. "The moment Draco got what he thought he wanted, to become a Death Eater, and given a mission by Lord Voldemort, as he did in Harry Potter and the Half-Blood Prince, reality finally hit him," Rowling said, because his dream was "so very different". She said that there was a real moral cowardice to Draco, but that he was not wholly bad.

== Evils of war ==
On the Harry Potter series, Rowling said on her United States book tour in October 2007, "I very consciously wanted to show what is one of the great evils of war, which is that totally innocent people are slaughtered... Another great evil of war is that children lose their families."

== Progressive values and diversity ==
Time magazine said in 2005, "Rowling adapts an inherently conservative genre for her own progressive purposes. Her Hogwarts is secular and sexual and multicultural and multiracial and even sort of multimedia, with all those talking ghosts." To mark the French publication of Deathly Hallows, prominent French center-left paper Liberation devoted the front cover and two more pages to answering the question "Why Harry Potter is of the Left".

In 2007, responding to a question from a child about Albus Dumbledore's love life, Rowling revealed, "I always saw Dumbledore as gay." Filling in a few more details, she said, "Dumbledore fell in love with Grindelwald.... Don't forget, falling in love can blind us. [He] was very drawn to this brilliant person. This was Dumbledore's tragedy."

Melissa Anelli, webmaster of the fan site The Leaky Cauldron, told The Associated Press, "Jo Rowling calling any Harry Potter character gay would make wonderful strides in tolerance toward homosexuality.... By dubbing someone so respected, so talented and so kind, as someone who just happens to be also homosexual, she's reinforcing the idea that a person's gayness is not something of which they should be ashamed." Of the ensuing controversy, Rowling said, "I know that it was a positive thing that I said it, for at least one person, because one man 'came out' at Carnegie Hall." Entertainment Weekly's Mark Harris said "her choice to make a beloved professor-mentor gay in a world where gay teachers are still routinely slandered as malign influences was, I am certain, no accident." Harris also says that there is a drastic underrepresentation of gays in the population, and it is a failure of decency and nerve on the entertainment industry— "including the tremendous number of gay producers, writers, and executives who sacrifice their convictions so they don't look too strident or political."

Think Progress, a progressive news site, reported on several conservative blogs that said that Rowling's revelation about Dumbledore vindicates Jerry Falwell's attacks on homosexuality in children's media that were lambasted by the mass media. "What's stopping her from saying that [Harry's friend] Neville grows up to be a paedophile?" said David Baggett, an associate philosophy professor at Falwell's Liberty University's School of Religion. Baggett, who coauthored the book Harry Potter and Philosophy: If Aristotle Ran Hogwarts, says he was taken aback not only by Rowling's announcement, but by the fact that it came on the heels of her confirming many Potter fans' belief that the series had Christian themes.

Slate Magazine quotes an attendee of the book talk who said, "It was clear that JKR didn't plan to out Dumbledore. She just cares about being true to her readers." Mike Thomas of the Orlando Sentinel said that upon reflection, Dumbledore was gay from the beginning, and that this neatly explains the behaviour of his character and his relationship with Grindelwald. Thomas notes the skill Rowling displays in writing a gay character without having to put a gay label on him.

According to Reuters, Rowling was surprised over the fuss and declined to say whether her "outing" of Dumbledore might alienate those who disapprove of homosexuality. "It has certainly never been news to me that a brave and brilliant man could love other men. He is my character. He is what he is and I have the right to say what I say about him," she said. Reaction has been mainly supportive on fans' websites, such as The Leaky Cauldron and MuggleNet.

Actor David Thewlis (Remus Lupin) said that he was surprised about Dumbledore's sexuality, because while he was filming Harry Potter and the Prisoner of Azkaban director Alfonso Cuarón had the idea that "Lupin was gay, and he described my character like a 'gay junkie'."

Catholic fantasy author Regina Doman wrote an essay titled "In Defense of Dumbledore", in which she argued that the books actually support Catholic teaching on homosexuality because Dumbledore's relationship with the dark wizard Grindelwald leads to obviously terrible results, as he becomes interested in dark magic himself, neglects his responsibilities towards his younger sister and ultimately causes her death.

The South Florida Sun-Sentinel's book reviewer Chauncey Mabe says that it was wrong for Rowling to disclose Dumbledore's sexual orientation. Mabe was clear that this was not due to Dumbledore's being gay, but to his own objections to authors continuing to talk about their books after they are written. He called for Rowling to "please be quiet, please" in "public gatherings", which is contrary to the massive popularity of Rowling's book talks and her fans' thirst for more information about characters in the Harry Potter books. Mabe notes that 1,000 children attended the "reading" before they were given autographed books. Robin Berkowitz, Sun-Sentinel Entertainment Editor says of Rowling's comments, and other revelations she might make about her characters "We don't need to know any of them to appreciate the books fully," "Don't ask, don't spell" a reference to the US military's former policy on homosexuality, Don't ask, don't tell. These sentiments are mirrored by Jeffrey Weiss in his article, "Harry Potter and the author who wouldn't shut up", published in the Dallas Morning News.

The Washington Post's Michael Gerson says "tolerance is one of the main themes of the Harry Potter books. In a marvelous social comparison, lycanthropy is treated as a kind of chronic disease, with werewolves subject to discrimination as if they had AIDS."

== Social activism ==
According to Philip Nel of Kansas State University, the Potter series can be seen as "political novels that critique racism and racial superiority. Rowling, who worked for Amnesty International, evokes her social activism through Hermione's passion for oppressed elves and the formation of her "Society for the Promotion of Elfish Welfare". Dobby the house elf has been compared to the labour lawyer Dobby Walker, who introduced Rowling's heroine, Jessica Mitford, to the Communist Party. Hermione is depicted as starting a campaign to emancipate the enslaved house elves, using the methods of real-world campaigns on social and political issues such as badges with slogans. She persists in this campaigning also when it is considered quixotic even by her close friends and not much appreciated even by most of the house elves themselves. But in Harry Potter and the Deathly Hallows, the campaign turns out to have had enormous unforeseen results, with house elves joining the struggle and making several indispensable contributions to Voldemort's final defeat, including saving the main protagonists' lives.

== Subversive and anarchistic message ==
Gerson of the Washington Post also described what he considered to be the very subversive nature of the Harry Potter books in the answer they offer to death. Voldemort believes that death must be mastered and "beaten". In contrast, Harry accepts the necessity of his own death for the sake of love. Gerson also suggests that some will ask the book series about tolerance also be a book series about religion. He answers that many others "believe – not in spite of their faith but because of it – that half-bloods, werewolves and others should be treated with kindness and fairness. Above all, believers are called to love, even at the highest cost."

In a 1999 interview with Rowling, The Guardian Unlimited's Joanna Carey said, "JK Rowling is every bit as witty and subversive as you'd expect. Rowling described her admiration of Jessica Mitford since age 14, her time at Exeter University "not quite the chance to be the 'radical' I planned", and said the later books dealing with Harry's hormones, and deaths would be unlike other children's series like the Famous Five. When Carey suggested a parallel between Harry Potter and Prince Harry, Rowling laughed it off, saying that a friend warned her to "never let the press make you discuss the royal family."

James Morone wrote in the American Prospect in 2001, "Magical headmaster Albus Dumbledore practically awards bonus points for breaking rules. Hogwarts School of Witchcraft and Wizardry is unruly, even slightly anarchic. Harry's classmate Hermione 'had become a bit more relaxed about breaking the rules,' writes Rowling near the end of Philosopher's Stone, 'and she was much nicer for it.' There's more than a touch of anarchy when all the students sing to their own tune. In her books, the kids are the central agents of their own lives. They make choices. Weigh judgments. Wrestle with freedom."

Isabelle Smadja of Le Monde wrote that Harry Potter is the first fictional hero of the anti-globalist, anti-capitalist, pro-Third World, "Seattle" generation. She wrote that "Examination of the text suggests that they are, in fact, a ferocious critique of consumer society and the world of free enterprise."

== Conservative objections to liberal and socialist values ==
The right-wing US John Birch Society has objected to Rowling's books and her public statements. In his article for the John Birch Society's magazine The New American, Constitution Party Communications Director Steve Bonta compared Harry Potter negatively to The Lord of the Rings, saying, "The Potter books read in places like diatribes against the modern middle class, especially whenever Harry confronts his ludicrously dysfunctional and downright abusive adopted family, the Dursleys."

== Accusations of conservative and sexist themes ==
The critic Anthony Holden wrote in The Observer on his experience of judging Harry Potter and the Prisoner of Azkaban for the 1999 Whitbread Awards. His overall view of the series was negative—"the Potter saga was essentially patronising, very conservative, highly derivative, dispiritingly nostalgic for a bygone Britain." A review in The Guardian echoed this interpretation and stated that "despite all of the books' gestures to multiculturalism and gender equality, Harry Potter is a conservative; a paternalistic, One-Nation Tory, perhaps, but a Tory nonetheless."

When an interviewer suggested her books portrayed a conservative world, Rowling replied, "So I'm told repeatedly. The two groups of people who are constantly thanking me are Wiccans and boarding schools. And really, don't thank me. I'm not with either of them. New ageism leaves me completely cold, and [my daughter] would never go to boarding school. I went to a comprehensive."

Rowling says she gets frustrated with the "conservative world thing", and that she made Hogwarts a boarding school so that action could happen in the middle of the night and to create a sense of community among the characters. Harry also reflects the modern world, she argues, in that he is mixed race — his father being pure-blood, his mother being Muggle-born. She also says her feminist conscience is saved by Hermione, "who's the brightest character" and is a "very strong female character".

== Neoliberal and capitalist values ==
Literary scholar Ilias Yocaris argued that Harry Potter "probably unintentionally ... appears as a summary of the social and educational aims of neoliberal capitalism." According to Yocaris' analysis, all life at Hogwarts is dominated by a culture of competition: "competition among students to be prefect; competition among Hogwarts houses to gain points; competition among sorcery schools to win the Triwizard tournament; and, ultimately, the bloody competition between the forces of Good and Evil." The free market plays a prominent and positive role, while the state (the Ministry of Magic) is presented as inefficient and bureaucratic. In this "pitiless jungle", education only aims to "give students an immediately exploitable practical knowledge that can help them in their battle to survive," while artistic subjects and social sciences are useless or absent. Yocaris concludes that "like Orwellian totalitarianism, this capitalism tries to fashion not only the real world, but also the imagination of consumer-citizens," producing literature that suggests that no alternative is possible. Michael Ostling also argued that the series depicts a modern capitalist and consumerist society, where the role of gadgetry is played by magic.

== Class distinctions ==
O: The Oprah Magazine noted that Rowling admires Roddy Doyle and Jane Austen, saying "both of whom write about class distinctions," and asked if the reason Rowling wrote about class was a conscious decision. Rowling replied, "kids are acutely aware of money—before they're aware of class. A kid isn't really going to notice how another kid holds his knife and fork. But a kid will be acutely aware that he doesn't have pocket money. Or that he doesn't have as much pocket money. I think back to myself at 11. Kids can be mean, very mean. So it was there in Ron not having the proper length robes, you know? And not being able to buy stuff on the trolley. He's got to have sandwiches his mum made for him, even though he doesn't like the sandwiches. Having enough money to fit in is an important facet of life—and what is more conformist than a school?"

== Anti-government interpretation ==
Libertarians Chris Van Landingham and Benjamin Barton see J. K. Rowling's portrayal of the bureaucratised Ministry of Magic and the oppressive measures taken by the Ministry in the later books (like making attendance at Hogwarts School compulsory and the "registration of Mudbloods" with the Ministry) as an allegory criticising the state. Barton says, "Rowling's scathing portrait of government is surprisingly strident and effective. This is partly because her critique works on so many levels: the functions of government, the structure of government, and the bureaucrats who run the show. All three elements work together to depict a Ministry of Magic run by self-interested bureaucrats bent on increasing and protecting their power, often to the detriment of the public at large. In other words, Rowling creates a public-interest scholar's dream—or nightmare—government."

== Characters compared to George Bush, Tony Blair, and Saddam Hussein ==
Newsweek magazine asked Alfonso Cuarón, director of the third film (based on Rowling's Prisoner of Azkaban), if the villainous wizard Voldemort still reminded him of George W. Bush. Cuarón confirmed, "In combination with Saddam. They both have selfish interests and are very much in love with power. Also, a disregard for the environment. A love for manipulating people. I read books four and five, and Fudge is similar to Tony Blair. He's the ultimate politician. He's in denial about many things. And everything is for the sake of his own persona, his own power. The way the Iraq thing was handled was not unlike the way Fudge handled affairs in book four."

Philosopher Jean-Claude Milner claimed "Harry Potter is a war machine against the Thatcherite-Blairist world and the 'American Way of Life'" in France's Libération.

Slate Magazine also says Rowling takes jabs at the Bush and Blair administrations suggesting the Ministry of Magic's security pamphlet recalls the much-scorned Operation TIPS (Terrorism Information and Prevention System). The author also suggests that Azkaban, the wizard penitentiary, is a stand-in for Guantanamo Bay.

The People's World claimed the books draw you "into the politics of the wizarding world—the 'Educational Decrees' from the toad-like Ministry of Magic representative, the high-level connections of 'war criminals' from the last rise of Voldemort, the predjudice [sic] against 'mudbloods' and 'half-breeds.'" They suggest connections "to the world we live in, to the similarities and differences between the Fudge administration and the Bush administration".

Rowling has never confirmed these interpretations in Harry Potter; however, when the then Chancellor Gordon Brown once asked her to endorse the Labour Party while Tony Blair was Prime Minister, Rowling refused. Rowling attacked the Blair government's policy on single parent families. She said that Labour could do "a good deal more" and then donated £500,000 to the One Parent Families charity to set an example. Rowling said that Brown's measures for children 'would have made a real difference to my family's life' when she was poor. Rowling donated £1 million to the Labour Party during the 2010 general election.

== Education reform in The Order of the Phoenix ==
The Scotsman cites "Delighted teachers who have hailed Harry Potter and the Order of the Phoenix as a blistering satire on years of politically motivated interference in the running of schools".

Rowling describes her character Dolores Umbridge, the Ministry-appointed headmistress of Hogwarts and under-secretary to the minister, Cornelius Fudge, saying "She has good contacts at the Ministry. She is one of those people, and they do exist in real life, who will always side with the established order. As far as she is concerned authority cannot be wrong so she doesn't question it, and I would go as far as to say that whatever happened and whoever took over at the Ministry, Umbridge would be there, she likes power. So she is going to side with the people who give her the authority."

Andrew Slack, founder of the Harry Potter Alliance, writes about the "Muggle Mindset" in which "Lindsay Lohan supersedes news about genocide, men assess their 'worth' by their paychecks, women's bodies are treated as commodities and our educational system preoccupies itself not with stimulating children's curiosity but rather getting them to efficiently regurgitate information on standardised tests."

Hungarian Secretary of State for Education Rózsa Hoffmann and her reforms received comparisons to Dolores Umbridge and her actions in the novels.

== Anti-terrorism ==
The Capitalism Magazine website says that, "With a long-term war in progress and threats of further terrorist attacks on American soil," Harry Potter isn't mere escapism and "shows a world in which happiness can be achieved, villains can be defeated, and the means of success can be learned."

Time magazine says that by Harry Potter and the Order of the Phoenix, "Harry is embroiled in a borderless, semi-civil war with a shadowy, hidden leader whose existence the government ignored until disaster forced the issue and who is supported by a secret network of sleeper agents willing to resort to tactics of shocking cruelty. The kids who grew up on Harry Potter—you could call them Generation Hex—are the kids who grew up with the pervasive threat of terrorism, and it's inevitable that on some level they'll make a connection between the two."

Slate Magazine's Julia Turner compares Harry Potter and the Half-Blood Prince to the war on terror in the context of the fight against Osama bin Laden saying Voldemort takes up terrorism by destroying bridges, murdering innocents, and forcing children to kill their elders. She also notes the parallels in the community's response saying Fred and George Weasley's shop makes a mint selling Shield Cloaks and the new Minister for Magic jails an innocent man, hoping to stave off panic and create the impression that he's taking action.

Steven Fielding argued that the changing portrayal of the Ministry of Magic – from incompetent to authoritarian – reflects Rowling's views on the war on terror.

Rowling said "I've never thought, 'It's time for a post-9/11 Harry Potter book,' no. But what Voldemort does, in many senses, is terrorism, and that was quite clear in my mind before 9/11 happened.... but there are parallels, obviously. I think one of the times I felt the parallels was when I was writing about the arrest of Stan Shunpike, you know? I always planned that these kinds of things would happen, but these have very powerful resonances, given that I believe, and many people believe, that there have been instances of persecution of people who did not deserve to be persecuted, even while we're attempting to find the people who have committed utter atrocities. These things just happen, it's human nature. There were some very startling parallels at the time I was writing it."

== Harry Potter used by political activists ==
=== KidSPEAK! ===
In response to restricted access to the Harry Potter books children began a letter-writing campaign, forming clubs and organising petitions, which ultimately merged into an internet site called Muggles for Harry Potter. The site evolved into kidSPEAK!, a forum for children to tackle censorship in general, and to fight for Harry Potter specifically.

=== The Harry Potter Alliance ===
Andrew Slack, an actor/comedian and Harry Potter aficionado, co-founded the Harry Potter Alliance (HPA) to highlight the crisis in Sudan and social inequities. In These Times featured Slack in 2007, in an article about Muggle Activists where Slack said, "The Harry Potter parallel to Darfur is simple: With both the Ministry of Magic and the Daily Prophet (the Wizarding World's mainstream news source) in denial that Voldemort has returned and evil is afoot, Harry and his underground rebel group, 'Dumbledore's Army,' work with the adult group, 'The Order of the Phoenix,' to awake the world. We in the Alliance seek to be Dumbledore's Army for the real world, working with anti-genocide organisations, such as 'Fidelity Out of Sudan' and the 'Genocide Intervention Network,' to wake our governments, corporations and media up to the fact that 'never again' means 'never again.'"

When Time magazine asked about The Harry Potter Alliance, Rowling said, "It's incredible, it's humbling, and it's uplifting to see people going out there and doing that in the name of your character. What did my books preach against throughout? Bigotry, violence, struggles for power, no matter what. All of these things are happening in Darfur. So they really couldn't have chosen a better cause." Rowling awarded The Harry Potter Alliance a Fan Site Award in December 2007.

In February 2010, the HPA ran a massive fundraiser to support those in dire need after the tragic event of the Haiti earthquake. Live webcasts were held in which celebrities (especially those a part of the Harry Potter Fandom) performed and encouraged viewers to donate money. Donations came through an auction that did not guarantee you the prize. Some items that were up for bid were: a signed set of the Harry Potter books, a guitar signed by actor Tom Felton, handmade earrings from actress Evanna Lynch, and a one thousand word story about whatever the winner wishes it to be written by Maureen Johnson and John Green. The webcasts were rather successful, garnering over $125,000. The original plan of Helping Haiti Heal was to have three plane fulls of aid (each one dubbed: Harry, Hermione, and Ron) shipped off to Haiti. As of June the same year, five planes were sent to Haiti, Harry, Hermione, Ron, DFTBA (Don't Forget To Be Awesome) and the last being Dumbledore. On 28 June, there was a livestream video celebrating the landing of Dumbledore. Evanna Lynch was present at the stream and even answered questions asked by fans. Ophelia Dahl, the daughter of the late British author Roald Dahl was also present since she worked with Partners in Health, who the Harry Potter Alliance teamed up with for Helping Haiti Heal.

In March 2010, The Harry Potter Alliance had a campaign for people to send in their books to the Mississippi Delta which went to Rwanda. As of June, when the campaign ended, they donated over 40,000 books. In July 2010, The Harry Potter Alliance won $250,000 in the Chase Community Giving contest. The money will go towards literacy, LGBT rights, and online community building.

=== Stop Big Media ===
Stop Big Media gained support from "Rocking Out Against Voldemedia", a compilation of ten original songs by ten Harry Potter-themed "Wizard Rock" bands. Andrew Slack and The Harry Potter Alliance compare media consolidation in the US to the control of the Ministry of Magic over the Daily Prophet in the Harry Potter books, saying "Once Voldemort took over every form of media in the Wizarding World, Dumbledore's Army and the Order of the Phoenix formed an independent media movement called "Potterwatch". Now the HP Alliance and Wizard Rock have come together to fight for a Potterwatch movement in the real world to fight back against Big VoldeMedia from further pushing out local and foreign news, minority representation, and the right to a Free Press."

=== Center for Science in the Public Interest ===
A worldwide campaign to "save Harry Potter from the clutches of the Coca-Cola Company" was launched by the nonprofit Center for Science in the Public Interest. The group says that by aggressively marketing sugar- and caffeine-laden drinks to young fans of the Harry Potter series, Coke is helping fuel the childhood obesity epidemic.

== See also ==
- Political views of J. K. Rowling

== Bibliography ==
- Barratt, B. (9 November 2012). The Politics of Harry Potter. Springer. ISBN 978-1-137-01654-6.
- Bell, Christopher E. (27 January 2016). "Heroes and Horcruxes: Dumbledore's Army as Metonym". In Christopher E. Bell (ed.). Wizards vs. Muggles: Essays on Identity and the Harry Potter Universe. McFarland. pp. 72–. ISBN 978-0-7864-9930-4.
- Biondi, Carrie-Ann, ed., "Imagining Better: Philosophical Issues in Harry Potter," in Reason Papers: A Journal of Interdisciplinary Normative Studies, vol. 34, no. 2 (June 2012).
- Darcy, Ann Catherine (20 July 2021). "Harry Potter: Why Dumbledore's Army Is So Important". Game Rant. Archived from the original on 25 May 2022.
- Rodeheaver, Misty D; Gradwell, Jill M; Dahlgren, Robert L (26 January 2015). ""We are Dumbledore's Army:" Forging the Foundation For Future Upstanders". Journal of International Social Studies. 4 (2): 57–72. Archived from the original on 27 March 2022.
- Rovan, Marcie Panutsos (22 July 2020). "Dumbledore's Army: A Case for Peer Tutoring". In Marcie Panutsos Rovan; Melissa Wehler (eds.). Lessons from Hogwarts: Essays on the Pedagogy of Harry Potter. McFarland. p. 35. ISBN 978-1-4766-4027-3.
- Sperger, Lena (19 February 2019). "World War II. Influence on the Harry Potter Series". The Circular.
