= The Late Age of Print =

The Late Age of Print: Everyday Book Culture from Consumerism to Control
- Author: Ted Striphas
- Language: English
- Subject: Publishing
- Publisher: Columbia University Press
- Publication date: 2009
- Publication place: United States
- Media type: Hardcover, E-book
- Pages: 272
- ISBN: 978-0-231-14814-6

The Late Age of Print: Everyday Book Culture from Consumerism to Control (2009) is a contemporary book written by Ted Striphas. Ted Striphas is an assistant professor in the Department of Communication and Culture and adjunct professor of American Studies and Cultural Studies at Indiana University.

In this book, Striphas talks about the history of books and reading, and discusses the contemporary world of book culture. He mentions the different phases in the production and propagation of books. According to Striphas, printing productions are still a part of our everyday lives. "With examples from trade journals, news media, films, advertisements, and a host of other commercial and scholarly materials, Striphas tells a story of modern publishing that proves, even in a rapidly digitizing world, books are anything but dead."

== Description ==
Striphas presents some trends and events that are taking place in the contemporary book and printing industry. "From the rise of retail superstores to Oprah's phenomenal reach, Striphas tracks the methods through which the book industry has adapted (or has failed to adapt) to rapid changes in twentieth-century print culture." However, he also states that because of the advancement of digital technology and e-books, the printing and bookbinding industries, according to him, are in danger. According to Columbia University Press, The Late Age of Print is somewhat an antidote for the statements that say the end of the book is near. Ted Striphas goes deep into the book culture and shows the definition and the meaning of books beyond reading, printing and archiving.

== Awards ==
Winner of Outstanding Book Award from National Communication Association's Critical Cultural Studies Division.

== Review ==
Striphas' impassioned appeal to have us rethink how we see originals and copies in an age of transnational cultural appropriation and transfiguration is a welcome finale to the book"— Sean Johnson Andrews, Reviews in Cultural Theory

"This collection of historical and commercial analysis should fascinate those seriously involved with book culture and/or the industry." — Publishers Weekly

"This book is a gold mine of information and thought about book culture in the 20th and 21st centuries." — Gwen M. Gregory, Information Today

"It is rare to say of a university press hardcover that it is a "must-read," but for those interested in the confluence of culture and economics as it relates to books, that is what The Late Age of Print is." — Richard Nash, Critical Flame

"I should warn you that the book’s a bit academic. Striphas teaches American Studies and Cultural Studies at Indiana University and he quotes Heidegger and Marx within the first few pages. He also has an annoying habit of telling you what he’s going to write about rather than just writing it (as well as summarizing everything at the end). These are academic protocols, I realize, but you have to expect your readers to be smart enough to get it the first round."
