= Maria Nikolajeva =

Swedish literary critic and academic

Maria Nikolajeva (born 16 May 1952) is a Swedish literary critic and academic, specialising in children's literature. She was professor of Education at the University of Cambridge and Professorial Fellow of Homerton College, Cambridge from 2008 until her retirement in July 2020. She was also Director of Cambridge's Centre for Children's Literature from 2010. She previously taught at Stockholm University and Åbo Akademi University.

== Selected works ==
- ——; Scott, Carole (2000). "The Dynamics of Picturebook Communication". Children's Literature in Education. 31 (4): 225–239. doi:10.1023/A:1026426902123.
- —— (2000). Bilderbokens pusselbitar (in Swedish). Lund: Studentlitteratur. ISBN 978-9144013626.
- —— (2004). Barnbokens byggklossar (in Swedish). Lund: Studentlitteratur. ISBN 978-9144035376.
- —— (2006). How picturebooks work. Abingdon: Routledge. ISBN 978-0415979689.
- —— (2009). Power, Voice and Subjectivity in Literature for Young Readers. Abingdon: Routledge. ISBN 978-0415802154.
- —— (1996). Children's Literature Comes of Age: Toward a New Aesthetic. Abingdon: Routledge. ISBN 978-1138946354.
