= Connie Ann Kirk =

American author

- Born: February 14, 1957 (age 69); Wellsville, New York, U.S.
- Occupation: Writer
- Writing career
- Genres: Nonfiction, Biography, Essays, References, Children's Literature
- Subjects: British and American literature, Fiction
- Notable works: Emily Dickinson: A Biography; Sky Dancers

Connie Ann Kirk (born February 14, 1957) is an American author. Her books cover a range of subjects including concise literary biographies for students, bio-critical literary studies, and references. She has also written a fiction picture book for children. Her articles, both in print and online, address topics in literature, poetry, popular culture, history, education, art, television, science, sports, and film.

== Life and education ==
Connie Ann Kirk was born on February 14, 1957, in Wellsville, New York, and raised in upstate New York.

She received a Ph.D. in English literature and creative writing from Binghamton University in 2004.

== Career ==
=== Published works ===
Among Kirk's first published books include several titles for Greenwood Press's series of concise biographies for students. One of these, which became a bestseller for the press, was a biography of British author J. K. Rowling. A reviewer at the School Library Journal wrote that "the scholarly writing style and evaluative content make this volume useful to high school students studying Rowling and her work."

That book has been translated into Japanese, Chinese, and Estonian.

In 2004, Kirk's children's picture book -- Sky Dancers—was published by Lee & Low Books. Sky Dancers is about the Mohawk skyscraper builders in 1930s New York City and was selected by The Children's Book Committee at Bank Street College of Education for their Best Children's Books of the Year and by Rutgers University's EconKids program as one of their "Top 5 Books on Human Resources."

Kirk developed an interest in poet Emily Dickinson during her doctoral studies at Binghamton. She has presented her scholarly work on the poet internationally, including at Oxford University. In addition, several of her articles related to the poet appear in academic journals and scholarly books. Her book on Emily Dickinson grew out of her dissertation.

==== Books ====
- Kirk, Connie Ann (2002). The Mohawks of North America. First Peoples. Minneapolis: Lerner Publishing Group. ISBN 978-0-8225-4853-9.
- —— (2003). "Chapter 15 - Writing Their Way Home: American Writers and Baseball". In Rielly, Edward J (ed.). Baseball and American Culture: Across the Diamond. New York: Haworth Press. pp. 173–181. ISBN 978-0-7890-1485-6.
- —— (2003). J. K. Rowling: A Biography. Westport, Conn: Greenwood Press. ISBN 978-0-313-32205-1.
- —— (2004). Emily Dickinson: A Biography. Westport, Conn: Greenwood Press. ISBN 978-0-313-32206-8.
- —— (2004). Mark Twain: A Biography. Westport, Conn: Greenwood Press. ISBN 978-0-313-33025-4.
- —— (2004). Sylvia Plath: A Biography. Westport, Conn: Greenwood Press. ISBN 978-0-313-33214-2.
- —— (2004). Sky Dancers. illus. by Christy Hale. New York: Lee & Low Books. ISBN 978-1-58430-162-2.
- —— (2005). Companion to American Children's Picture Books. Westport, Conn: Greenwood Press. ISBN 978-0-313-32287-7.
- —— (2006). A Student's Guide to Robert Frost. Understanding Literature. Berkeley Heights, NJ: Enslow Publishers. ISBN 978-0-7660-2434-2.
- —— (2008). A Student's Guide to Jane Austen. Understanding Literature. Berkeley Heights, NJ: Enslow Publishers. ISBN 978-0-7660-2439-7.
- —— (2008). Critical Companion to Flannery O'Connor. New York: Facts on File. ISBN 978-0-8160-6417-5.
- —— (2016). Reading and Interpreting the Works of Robert Frost. Berkeley Heights, New Jersey: Enslow Publishers. ISBN 978-0766073500.
- —— (2016). Reading and Interpreting the Works of Jane Austen. Berkeley Heights, New Jersey: Enslow Publishers. ISBN 978-0766079113.

=== Other works ===
In addition to her published writing in print and online, Kirk has moderated a number of online discussion groups including the Classics, Shakespeare, and Harry Potter forums for the former Barnes & Noble Book Club at BN.com. She also developed and taught a course in Emily Dickinson's life and poetry that offered continuing education credit at the former Barnes & Noble University, also at BN.com.
