= Ted Striphas =

American academic and author

Theodore G. Striphas is an American academic and author of The Late Age of Print.

== Career ==
Born in Goshen, New York, Striphas received his PhD from the University of North Carolina at Chapel Hill. He is currently a Professor and Chair of Media Studies in the College of Media, Communication and Information at the University of Colorado Boulder. Striphas additionally serves as affiliate faculty in Information Science at the University of Colorado Boulder. He is the co-editor of the journal Cultural Studies.

== The Late Age of Print ==
The Late Age of Print is Striphas's best-known and best-selling work, published by Columbia University Press. The book discusses technological innovations in printing and publishing, such as Google's book scanning and Amazon's Kindle. In addition, The Late Age of Print discusses the inevitability of the Borders bankruptcy and subsequent closure. The book has received generally positive reviews from The Guardian and other sources.

Striphas's blog continues discussion of the critical and technological issues raised in The Late Age of Print. The blog has received praise from Canadian Broadcasting Corporation and other sources.

== Algorithmic Culture Before the Internet ==
Published in 2023 with Columbia University Press, Algorithmic Culture Before the Internet traces shifting definitions of culture to mark historic engagement with algorithms before the development of the technological tool. Striphas attributes acting in a play The G.I.G.O. Effect in fifth grade as an early foundation for the book, in which an artificial intelligence insists "Human beings, you are the original computer!"

== Awards ==
He received the 2010 Book of the Year Award from the National Communication Association's Critical Cultural Studies Division for The Late Age of Print.

Algorithmic Culture Before the Internet was an honorable mention for the 2024 Ángel David Nieves Book Award from the Digital Humanities Caucus of the American Studies Association.
