= Robert Glenister =

English actor (born 1960)

- Born: Robert Lewis Glenister; 11 March 1960 (age 66); Watford, Hertfordshire, England
- Occupation: Actor
- Years active: 1979–present
- Known for: Hustle
- Spouses: Amanda Redman (m. 1984; div. 1992) Celia de Wolff (m. 1999)
- Children: 2
- Parent: John Glenister (father)
- Relatives: Philip Glenister (brother)

Robert Lewis Glenister (born 11 March 1960) is an English actor. He is best known for his television roles as Ash "Three Socks" Morgan in the crime drama series Hustle (2004–2012) and Nicholas Blake in the spy drama series Spooks (2006–2010).

== Early life ==
Glenister was born in Watford on 11 March 1960. He is the son of Joan Fry Lewis and television director John Glenister, and the older brother of actor Philip Glenister. Until the age of eight he had a slight speech impediment. After starting school, he began to show a talent for acting. He decided to pursue a professional acting career after being encouraged by his father and leaving Harrow Weald Grammar School. He started his career by taking several theatre roles.

== Career ==
Glenister made his television debut in the BBC sitcom Sink or Swim, which ran from 1980 until 1982. He has also appeared in shows such as Soldier Soldier, Only Fools and Horses (as Myles the millionaire garden centre owner and chairman of the SWANS committee), A Touch of Frost and Inspector George Gently as well as several films.

He had a starring role in the BBC drama Hustle as Ash Morgan, a high-level con-man who has to convincingly play various roles or characters to pull off a con and lure a 'mark'. He is the only actor who has appeared in every episode of the series. He has also had regular starring roles in the BBC drama Spooks and appeared in Spartacus. He appeared as an Irish-American mob boss in Ben Affleck's crime drama Live by Night, which was released in December 2016. He has been cast twice in Doctor Who, playing Salateen in The Caves of Androzani (1984) (opposite his Sink or Swim co-star Peter Davison) and Thomas Edison in "Nikola Tesla's Night of Terror" (2020).

In June 2022 he appeared as Detective Inspector Salisbury in Sherwood, a BBC serial written by James Graham. In 2024, he played Tony, a cab driver in the Channel 5 thriller series The Night Caller.

== Personal life ==
Glenister married actor Amanda Redman in 1984. The couple had a daughter before they divorced in 1992. He later married BBC Radio producer and director Celia de Wolff, with whom he has a son, actor Tom Glenister

In April 2019, it was reported that lawyers acting for a company owned by Glenister – Big Bad Wolff – had lost an appeal in a long-running battle with HM Revenue and Customs regarding liability for National Insurance contributions. Glenister subsequently said that he would have to sell or remortgage his house as a result of the ruling, since he now faced a bill of £147,000 plus interest.

== Filmography ==
=== Film ===
Year	Title	Role	Notes	Ref.
1979	Birth of the Beatles	Replacement Drummer		
1987	Hyper Combat Unit Dangaioh	Gil Berg	Direct-to-video; Voice role; English version	
1991	Arslân Senki	Gardeep / Zante	Direct-to-video; Voice role; English version	
1992	Arslân Senki II	Gardeep / Zante	Direct-to-video; Voice role; English version	
1993	The Secret Rapture	Jeremy		
2000	Persuasion	Captain Harville	You can't dance; Short film	
2001	Just Visiting	Earl of Warwick		
2001	Lover's Prayer	Count Malevsky		
2002	Safe Conduct	Captain Townsend		
2003	Victoria Station	The Controller	Short film	
2007	Get Off My Land	Farmer	Short film	
2009	Creation	Sir Henry Holland		
2011	Of Mary	Peter	Short film	
2012	Worm	Dad / Worm	Short film	
2014	Cryptic	Robert		
2016	Live by Night	Albert White		
2017	Journey's End	The Colonel		
2019	The Aeronauts	Ned Chambers		
2020	Villain	Roy Garrett		
2020	Spanish Pigeon	Harry Gold	Short film	
2022	National Theatre Live: The Seagull	Pyotr Nikolayevich Sorin		

=== Television ===
Year	Title	Role	Notes	Ref.
1979	Crown Court	Kevin Laurence	Episode: "Forever"	
1980	Escape	Lorenzo	Episode: "The Cartland Murders"	
1980	Strangers	Student	Episode: "Clowns Don't Cry"	
1980–82	Sink or Swim	Steve Webber	Series regular; 19 episodes	
1981	Strike: The Birth of Solidarity	Jurek Borowczak	TV film	
1981	ITV Playhouse	Billy	Episode: "Little Girls Don't"	
1982	Panorama	Kowalczyk	Episode: "Two Weeks in Winter: How the Army Took Over Poland"	
1983	The Campaign	Jon Lansman	TV film	
1984, 2020	Doctor Who	Salateen/Thomas Edison	Stories: "The Caves of Androzani"/ "Nikola Tesla's Night of Terror"	
1984	The Lonelyhearts Kid	Ken	Series regular; 6 episodes	
1985	Cover Her Face	Derek Pullen	Miniseries; 4 episodes	
1985	Summer Season	Peter	Episode: "Long Term Memory"	
1985	Juliet Bravo	Inspector Roger Beavers	Episode: "Inspection"	
1985	Me and the Girls	Harry	TV film	
1986	Watching	Tom Anderson	TV film	
1988	The Bill	Sam Rice	Episode: "Blue for a Boy"	
1989	Megazone 23	Bishop / Jacker	Miniseries; Voice role; English version	
1989	Ending Up	Keith	TV film	
1990	Chancer	Colin Morris	Series regular; 11 episodes	
1990	Blood Rights	Pete	Miniseries; 3 episodes	
1990	Casualty	Duncan	Episode: "Salvation"	
1991	Kinsey	Mike Hoskyns	Recurring role; 4 episodes	
1991	Soldier Soldier	Colour Sergeant Ian Anderson	Recurring role; 7 episodes	
1992	The Bill	D.I. Baker	Episode: "Lost Boy"	
1992	Boon	Mr. Richards	Episode: "Whispering Grass"	
1992	Only Fools and Horses	Myles	Episode: "Mother Nature's Son"	
1993	Medics	Steven Nelson	Episode: "Series 3, Episode 5"	
1993–95	Arslân Senki II	Gardeep / Zante	Miniseries; Voice role; English version	
1994	Screen Two	Brian Jessel	Episode: "A Landing on the Sun"	
1994	Casualty	Chris Wilson	Episode: "Grand Rational"	
1994	Pie in the Sky	D.C.I. Fields	Episode: "An Innocent Man"	
1995	Kavanagh QC	Clive Pendle	Episode: "Heartland"	
1995	Screen Two	Captain Harville	Episode: "Persuasion"	
1995	Prime Suspect	Chris Hughes	Episode: "The Lost Child"	
1995	The Bill	Paramedic	Episode: "Good Intentions"	
1995	Aristophanes: The Gods Are Laughing	Aristophanes	TV film	
1996	Bramwell	Charles Sheldon	Episode: "Series 2, Episode 7"	
1997	Drovers' Gold	Markby	Miniseries; 1 episode	
2000	Dirty Work	Tubes	Series regular; 6 episodes	
2000	My Fragile Heart	Stephen 'Squeal' Blake	Miniseries; 2 episodes	
2001	Midsomer Murders	John Field	Episode: "Dark Autumn"	
2001–03	A Touch of Frost	D.S. Terrence Reid	Recurring role; 4 episodes	
2002	Heartbeat	Oliver Langley	Episode: "The Shoot"	
2002	Murder	Robert Weldon	Miniseries; 4 episodes	
2002	Sirens	D.I. Clive Wilson	Miniseries; 2 episodes	
2003	Hitler: The Rise of Evil	Anton Drexler	Miniseries; 2 episodes	
2003	Roger Roger	Dr. Geoff	Episode: "Freedom's Just Another Word for Nothing Left to Lose"	
2003	Between the Sheets	Clive Stevenson	Miniseries; 6 episodes	
2003	Eroica	Gerhardt	TV film	
2004	The Badness of King George IV		TV film	
2004	Who Killed Thomas Becket?	Narrator	TV film	
2004–12	Hustle	Ash Morgan	Series regular; 48 episodes	
2005	Class of '76	Frank Thompson	Miniseries; 2 episodes	
2005	Legless	Simon Carter	TV film	
2006	Jane Hall	Dave Searle	Series regular; 6 episodes	
2006	The Sally Lockhart Mysteries: The Ruby in the Smoke	Samuel Selby	TV film	
2006–10	Spooks	Nicholas Blake	Recurring role; 15 episodes	
2008	Heroes and Villains	Marcus Licinius Crassus	Episode: "Spartacus"	
2008	Inspector George Gently	Empton	Episode: "The Burning Man"	
2009	Law & Order: UK	D.S. Jimmy Valentine	Episode: "Honour Bound"	
2009–14	Law & Order: UK	Narrator	Series regular; Voice role; Uncredited	
2010	Moving On	Frankie	Episode: "Skin Deep"	
2011	Appropriate Adult	Detective Superintendent John Bennett	Miniseries; 2 episodes	
2012	We'll Take Manhattan	Ted Shrimpton	TV film	
2013	Agatha Christie's Marple	Father Brophy	Episode: "Greenshaw's Folly"	
2013	The Café	Phil Porter	Series regular; 7 episodes	
2013	The Great Train Robbery	DI Frank Williams	Miniseries; 2 episodes	
2014	Vera	Owen Preece	Episode: "Death of a Family Man"	
2014	Masterpiece Mystery!	Father Raphy	Episode: "Agatha Christie's Miss Marple VII: Greenshaw's Folly"	
2015	Code of a Killer	DCC Chapman	Miniseries; 2 episodes	
2016	The Musketeers	Duke of Lorraine	Recurring role; 2 episodes	
2016	Paranoid	Bobby Day	Miniseries; 8 episodes	
2016	Close to the Enemy	Brigadier Wainwright	Miniseries; 7 episodes	
2017	Cold Feet	George Kirkbright	Recurring role; 5 episodes	
2019	Curfew	Jared Grieves	Series regular; 6 episodes	
2020	Isolation Stories	Ron	Episode: "Ron & Russell"	
2020	Strike	Jasper Chiswell	Story: "Lethal White"	
2022	Suspicion	Martin Copeland	Series regular; 6 episodes	
2022, 2026	Sherwood	DI Kevin Salisbury	Series regular; 6 episodes	
2023	The Night Caller	Tony	Miniseries; 4 episodes	
2024	Kidnapped: The Chloe Ayling Story	Piers Morgan	Miniseries; 1 episode	
2025	A Thousand Blows	Indigo Jeremy		
2025	Here We Go	Michael	Series 3, episode 6: "Dad's Red Hat"	
2025	The Light in the Hall	Robert	Season 2	

== Selected theatre ==
- Edward Voysey in The Voysey Inheritance by Harley Granville Barker. Directed by Greg Hersov at the Royal Exchange, Manchester. (1989)
- Prince Muishkin in The Idiot by Gerard McLarnon. World premiere directed by Greg Hersov at the Royal Exchange, Manchester. (1991)
- Lord Gorin in An Ideal Husband by Oscar Wilde. Directed by James Maxwell at the Royal Exchange, Manchester. (1992)
- Astrov in Uncle Vanya by Anton Chekhov. Directed by Greg Hersov at the Royal Exchange, Manchester. (2001)
- Wilson Tikkel in Great Britain by Richard Bean at the National Theatre/Theatre Royal Haymarket, 2014–15.
- Dave Moss in Glengarry Glen Ross by David Mamet at The Playhouse Theatre 2017–2018
- Sorin in The Seagull by Anton Chekhov at the Harold Pinter Theatre, London (2022)

== Radio ==
- The Party Party 1987
- Paradise Lost – Christ (1992, 41 episodes, BBC Radio 4)
- Paradise Regained – Christ (1992, 9 episodes, BBC Radio 4)
- The Wench is Dead – Sgt. Lewis (1992, BBC Radio 4) opposite John Shrapnel as Inspector Morse
- Last Seen Wearing – Sgt. Lewis (1994, BBC Radio 4) opposite John Shrapnel as Inspector Morse
- The Sound of Fury (Mike Warner) – Stuart Colman (1994, BBC Radio 4) opposite Anton Lesser as Billy Fury
- The Three Musketeers (Alexandre Dumas) – Athos (1994, 6 episodes, BBC Radio 4)
- Battle for the Dome – Lorenzo Ghiberti (1995, BBC Radio 4)
- Barrymore Plus Four (1995)
- The Silent World of Nicholas Quinn – Sgt. Lewis (1996, BBC Radio 4) opposite John Shrapnel as Inspector Morse
- Mansfield Park – Edmund Bertram (1997, Classic Serial, BBC Radio 4)
- Ghost on the Moor – Graham (2001, Afternoon Play, BBC Radio 4)
- A Game of Marbles – Lord Elgin (2004, Afternoon Play, BBC Radio 4) opposite Paul Scofield
- The Woman in Black – Arthur Kipps (2004, 4 episodes, BBC Radio 5)
- Henry's Girls – Henry Purcell (2007, Afternoon Play, BBC Radio 4)
- The Fiery World – William Blake (2007, Drama on 3, BBC Radio 3)
- The Gibson – Saul Judd (2008, 6-part Drama, BBC Radio 4)
- The Time Machine – Time traveller (2009, Drama on 3, BBC Radio 3)
- The Journey – Stephen (2010, Afternoon Play, BBC Radio 4)
- The Exorcist – Father Damien Karras (2014, 2 episodes, BBC Radio 4) opposite Ian McDiarmid as Father Merrin

== Audio drama ==
- Doctor Who: Absolution (2007) – Aboresh

== Audiobook ==
=== Cormoran Strike ===
- The Cuckoo's Calling (2013)
- The Silkworm (2014)
- Career of Evil (2015)
- Lethal White (2018)
- Troubled Blood (2020)
- The Ink Black Heart (2022)
- The Running Grave (2023)
- The Hallmarked Man (2025)

=== Others ===
- The Death of Kings (2008)
- The Gates of Rome (2010)
