= The Cuckoo's Calling =

2013 detective novel by J. K. Rowling

- First edition in the United Kingdom
- Authors: Robert Galbraith
- Language: English
- Genre: Crime fiction
- Publisher: Sphere Books (Little, Brown & Company)
- Publication date: 4 April 2013
- Publication place: United Kingdom
- Pages: 464
- ISBN: 9781408703991
- Followed by: The Silkworm

The Cuckoo's Calling is a crime fiction novel written by British author J. K. Rowling, published under the pseudonym Robert Galbraith. It is the first novel in the Cormoran Strike series of detective novels and was first published on 4 April 2013. It was followed by The Silkworm in 2014, Career of Evil in 2015, Lethal White in 2018, Troubled Blood in 2020, The Ink Black Heart in 2022, and The Running Grave in 2023. An eighth book The Hallmarked Man was published on 2 September 2025.

== Plot ==
Disabled Afghan War veteran and private investigator Cormoran Strike sleeps in his office after breaking up with his on-again, off-again aristocratic girlfriend, Charlotte Campbell. Robin Ellacott, recently engaged to longtime boyfriend Matthew Cunliffe, is mistakenly assigned by a temp agency as Strike's secretary, and their first encounter is very awkward. Strike is approached by lawyer John Bristow, the adoptive brother of Strike's childhood schoolmate Charlie, to reinvestigate the alleged suicide of his sister, supermodel Lula Landry. Although unconvinced, Strike takes the case, keen to repay a loan taken from his absentee biological father, rock star Johnny Rokeby. Finding Robin more resourceful and efficient than he expected, Strike extends her stay.

The two set about interviewing Lula's friends and acquaintances, and learn that she was becoming interested in her black roots and biological family before her death. A neighbor, Tansy Bestigui, claims to have overheard an argument prior to Lula’s fall from her apartment balcony, but is dismissed as a liar by the police. Guy Some, a fashion designer and friend, suggests that Lula’s drug addict boyfriend, Evan Duffield, is responsible. Fellow supermodel Ciara Porter refutes this, saying that Lula made a comment about “leaving everything to her brother” in the day leading up to her death. Strike and Robin locate a friend of Lula’s from psychiatric treatment, Rochelle, who seems to know more than she lets on. Robin is forced to relay a message from Charlotte that she has gotten engaged to another man following her breakup with Strike, and comforts him when he gets drunk and mourns the relationship.

After seeing Lula’s apartment, Strike deduces that Tansy had been locked out on the frozen balcony by her abusive husband following a heated argument over her cocaine use at the time of Lula’s death, and was threatened into lying about how she overheard it. Rochelle is found dead in the Thames, drowned hours after first meeting with Strike; he becomes convinced that she was in contact with the killer. Robin discovers the identity of Lula’s deceased biological father, a Ghanaian academic, and tracks down Lula’s biological brother Jonah, a soldier in the British army. From shop assistants’ gossip, they deduce that Lula was trying to meet Jonah the night of her death. Strike visits Lula’s mother’s house, and discovers that she has left a will hidden in the purse she carried the day she died.

Strike invites John Bristow to his office and accuses him of killing Lula and Rochelle, as well as Charlie, whom everyone believed died after riding his bicycle into a quarry. Jealous of her success and desperate for handouts to cover up his own embezzlement at work, John hid in Lula’s apartment building before killing her and escaping, engaging Strike in an attempt to bring Lula’s relationship with Jonah to light and frame him for the crime. Rochelle, who knew Lula was meeting Jonah the night of her death and served as witness for her revised will, was blackmailing John for money. Realising he has been caught, Bristow tries to stab Strike and frame a crazed former client for his death, only to be subdued after Robin enters the office.

Sometime later, Robin prepares to leave for a new permanent job, and Strike gives her a parting gift, an expensive dress that she tried on during the investigation. At the last moment, the two agree on an arrangement that will allow her to stay on.

== Characters ==
=== Major characters ===
- Cormoran Strike: a struggling private investigator. He has few clients, a large debt, and is obliged by a recent break-up to sleep in his office on Denmark Street. He lost his leg in the Afghan war.
- Robin Ellacott: Strike's temporary secretary. She has recently moved from Yorkshire with her boyfriend and becomes engaged the night before the novel begins. She is enthusiastic about detective work, and is very intelligent, competent and resourceful.
- Lula Landry (Lula Bristow): a model who died in a fall three months prior to the events of the novel, which police had determined was suicide. John Bristow hires Strike to determine the truth.
- John Bristow: Strike's client and Lula's adoptive brother.
- Charlie Bristow: John Bristow's brother and a boyhood friend of Strike's who died when he fell into a quarry when he was around nine or ten years old. Charlie was about six years older than Lula Landry (Bristow).
- Alison Cresswell: in a relationship with John Bristow. She is secretary for Tony Landry and Cyprian May in their legal practice.
- Tony Landry: Lula and John's maternal uncle. He disapproved of Lula's lifestyle, and objected to Lula's adoption in the first instance. He has a difficult relationship with his sister.
- Lady Yvette Bristow: Lula and John's adopted mother. She is terminally ill during the novel and her relations with Lula were strained.
- Sir Alec Bristow: Lady Bristow's late husband. He founded his own electronics company, Albris. Sir Alec was sterile and could not have children of his own. He and Lady Bristow adopted three children: John, Charlie, and Lula Bristow. Lula was adopted when she was four years old, shortly after Charlie's death. Sir Alec died suddenly from a heart attack.
- Cyprian May: a senior partner at the law firm where John Bristow works.
- Ursula May (Chillingham): Tansy Bestigui's sister and Cyprian May's wife.

=== Lula's social circle ===
- Evan Duffield: Lula's on-off boyfriend, an actor with documented drug problems. The media called him the suspect, but he has an alibi.
- Rochelle Onifade: a homeless friend of Lula's, whom she met in an outpatient clinic.
- Guy Somé (Kevin Owusu): a fashion designer with a close (though platonic) relationship with Lula. He is the one who calls her 'Cuckoo'.
- Deeby Macc: an American rapper who was scheduled to arrive and stay in the apartment below Lula's in Kentigern Gardens on the night of her death.
- Kieran Kolovas-Jones: Lula's personal driver who has aspirations as an actor.
- Ciara Porter: a model, and a friend of Lula's.
- Freddie Bestigui: a film producer and neighbour of Lula's. He and his wife Tansy are in the process of a divorce.
- Tansy Bestigui (Chillingham): Freddie's wife who claims to have overheard events on the night of Lula's death. She is the sister of Ursula May.
- Bryony Radford: Lula's personal makeup artist and one of the people she meets on the day of her death.

=== Lula's biological family ===
- Marlene Higson: Lula's biological mother, much poorer than Lula's adoptive family. She had two sons after Lula, but both were taken away by social services.
- Dr Joseph 'Joe' Agyeman: Lula's biological father, an academic specialising in African and Ghanaian politics. He died five years before the events of the novel.
- Jonah Agyeman: Lula's biological half-brother, serving in the British Army in Afghanistan.

=== Cormoran and Robin's friends and family ===
- Lucy: Strike's younger half-sister. He admits to being fonder of her than almost anyone else, though their relationship is often strained.
- Jonny Rokeby: Strike's famous pop-star father who has only met him twice in his lifetime.
- Leda Strike: Strike's mother, a "supergroupie" of Jonny Rokeby's. She died of a heroin overdose, a drug she had not previously used, when Strike was 20. He has always suspected his stepfather had something to do with her death.
- Charlotte Campbell: Strike's long-time, rich, and mercurial fiancée, from whom he splits as the novel starts.
- Matthew Cunliffe: Robin's fiancé, an accountant. He does not approve of her working for Strike, whom he initially considers to be a shady character.

=== Other characters ===
- Eric Wardle: a detective sergeant who handles Lula Landry's death.
- Roy Carver a detective inspector who handles Lula Landry's death. He is Wardle's superior.

== Development ==
=== Background ===
Over the years, Rowling often spoke of writing a crime novel. In 2007, during the Edinburgh Book Festival, author Ian Rankin was reported as saying that his wife spotted Rowling "scribbling away" at a detective novel in a cafe. Rankin later clarified that his earlier comment was part of a joke delivered onstage which had been misinterpreted in the press as a factual report. The rumour persisted with The Guardian's speculating in 2012 that Rowling's next book would be a crime novel.

=== Publication ===
The BBC reported that Rowling sent the manuscript to the publishers anonymously, and at least one publishing house declined it, including Orion Books. It was eventually accepted by Sphere Books, which is an imprint of Little, Brown & Company, with whom Rowling had collaborated on her previous novel, The Casual Vacancy (2012).

=== Identification ===
Rowling's authorship was revealed by The Sunday Times on 13 July 2013 after it investigated how a first-time author "with a background in the army and the civilian security industry" could write such an assured debut novel. The Sunday Times enlisted the services of University of Oxford professor Peter Millican and Duquesne University professor Patrick Juola, whose software programs ran analyses of the novel and other Rowling works, comparing them with the works of other authors. However, it was later reported that Rowling's authorship had been leaked to a Sunday Times reporter via Twitter by the friend of the wife of a lawyer at Russells Solicitors, who had worked for Rowling. The firm subsequently apologised and made a "substantial charitable donation" to the Soldiers' Charity as a result of legal action brought by Rowling.

After being revealed as the author, Rowling said she would have liked to remain anonymous for a while longer, stating: "Being Robert Galbraith has been such a liberating experience... It has been wonderful to publish without hype and expectation and pure pleasure to get feedback under a different name."

== Editions ==
The first printing of the first UK edition ran to at least 1,500 copies, with a cover that features a quote from Val McDermid, while the back cover has quotes from Mark Billingham and Alex Gray. All three are fellow crime novelists, who deny having been told Galbraith's true identity. It was stated on the book's dust jacket that 'Robert Galbraith' was a pseudonym, but the adjoining biographical details provided about Galbraith's time with the Royal Military Police suggested that the pseudonym was employed simply to protect the identity of a government official, somewhat in the manner of John le Carré.

The copyright page does not have a number line but simply states, 'First published in Great Britain in 2013 by Sphere'. The copyright page of the second printings of the first UK edition does not have a number line either, but in addition to the 'first published' line quoted above has a second line stating 'Reprinted 2013 (twice)'. (Trade paperback editions and hardbacks share the same imprint page, and this page lists the number of reprints; it is updated each time there is a reprint. In this case, the trade paperback reprinted prior to the hardback.) The reprint also features an amended back cover with additional quotes, while the revised inside flaps now acknowledge Rowling's authorship.

== Sales and reception ==
Before Rowling's identity as the book's author was revealed, 1,500 copies of the printed book had been sold since its release in April 2013, plus another 7,000 copies of the ebook, audiobook, and library editions. The book surged from 4,709th to the best-selling novel on Amazon after it was revealed on 14 July 2013 that the book was written by Rowling under the pseudonym "Robert Galbraith". Signed copies of the first edition are selling for $US4,000–6,000.

The book received mostly positive reviews. Most of them came only after Rowling became known as the author, but the early reactions were generally complimentary as well. After the revelation of the author's identity, Declan Burke of The Irish Times gave a very positive review, particularly enjoying its "satisfyingly complex plot that winds through the labyrinth of London's vulgar rich" as well as its characterization, and deeming it to be "easily one of the most assured and fascinating debut crime novels of the year." Writing for USA Today, Charles Finch echoed this sentiment, also writing: "In both its broad strokes and in dozens of flairs of perception like this one, The Cuckoo's Calling shows that all great fiction—even if it only concerns our workaday world—has its own kind of magic." Slate's Katy Waldman also reacted favourably to the book, lauding its narration and characters and drawing parallels between the book and the Harry Potter series.

In The Plain Dealer, Laura DeMarco hailed Rowling for "fully flesh[ing] out her cast", elaborating: "It's a testament to Rowling's skillful way of imbuing humanity to her characters that although Lula is killed months before the story starts, she comes to life a flesh-and-blood woman in the way many fictional crime victims do not." Publishers Weekly and Michiko Kakutani of The New York Times concurred, with the latter opining: "Strike and his now-permanent assistant, Robin (playing Robin to his Batman, Nora to his Nick, Salander to his Blomkvist), have become a team—a team whose further adventures the reader cannot wait to read." Another positive review came from The Huffington Post, whose David Kudler praised the book as a "taut, well-written mystery that does a wonderful job of reviving an all-but-dead genre" but considered the psychology behind the crime "a bit of a stretch." The Hindustan Times also enjoyed the book, calling it "an entertaining story with characters who hold the reader's interest" but one noted that the conclusions drawn seemed "a little too out-of-nowhere." Jake Kerridge, in his The Daily Telegraph review, awarded the book four stars out of five and summed up the novel as "a sharply contemporary novel full of old-fashioned virtues; there is room for improvement in terms of construction, but it is wonderfully fresh and funny."

Thom Geier of Entertainment Weekly gave the book a "B+" and wrote: "Despite the contemporary milieu and sprinkling of F-words, The Cuckoo's Calling is decidedly old-fashioned. Rowling serves up a sushi platter of red herring, sprinkling clues along the way, before Strike draws a confession out of the killer in a climax straight out of Agatha Christie." London Evening Standard gave a mixed review, commending its satirical tone and classic plot, but criticising its "extraordinarily clunky, over-descriptive style that Rowling has made so much her own." A negative review came from NPR's Maureen Corrigen, who slammed the book for being a clichéd "'Mayhem Parva' school of British detective fiction" and its weak characters, writing: "the most intriguing unsolved mystery in The Cuckoo's Calling is why, in this post-Lisbeth Salander age, Rowling would choose to outfit her female lead with such meek and anachronistic feminine behavior."

=== Awards and honours ===
- 2013 Los Angeles Times Book Prize (Mystery/thriller), winner.
- 2021 Nielsen Bestseller Awards - Platinum Winner.

== Sequels ==
Rowling confirmed in a statement published on her website that she "fully intends to keep writing the series", and would do so under the pseudonym. The title of the sequel, The Silkworm, and its publication date, 19 June, were announced on 17 February 2014. It saw Strike and his assistant, Robin Ellacott, investigating the disappearance of Owen Quine, a writer in possession of a damaging manuscript. A third book, Career of Evil, was published in 2015. The title of the fourth book, Lethal White, was announced on 14 March 2017, the book was published on 18 September 2018. The fifth book, Troubled Blood, was published on 15 September 2020. A sixth book, The Ink Black Heart, was published on 30 August 2022. A seventh book, The Running Grave was published on 26 September 2023. An eight book The Hallmarked Man was published on 2 September 2025.

== In other media ==
=== Television ===
On 10 December 2014, it was announced that the novels would be adapted as Strike, a television series for BBC One, starting with The Cuckoo's Calling. Rowling will executive produce the series through her production company Brontë Film and Television, along with Neil Blair and Ruth Kenley-Letts. The three event dramas will be based on scripts by Ben Richards who will write The Cuckoo's Calling, and Tom Edge who will write The Silkworm and Career of Evil. Michael Keillor will direct The Cuckoo's Calling, Kieron Hawkes will direct The Silkworm and Charles Sturridge will direct Career of Evil. Jackie Larkin will produce.

In September 2016, it was announced that Tom Burke was set to play Cormoran Strike in the adaptation. and in November 2016 it was announced that Holliday Grainger will star as Strike's assistant, Robin Ellacott.

The series also stars Leo Bill as John Bristow, Elarica Johnson as Lula Landry, Martin Shaw as Tony Landry, Tara Fitzgerald as Tansy Bestigui, Tezlym Senior-Sakutu as Rochelle Onifade, David Avery as Nico Kolovas-Jones, Brian Bovell as Derrick Wilson, Siân Phillips as Lady Yvette Bristow, Bronson Webb as Evan Duffield, Amber Anderson as Ciara Porter, Kadiff Kirwan as Guy Some, Kerr Logan as Matthew Cunliffe, and Killian Scott as DI Eric Wardle.
