= Career of Evil =

2015 crime novel by Robert Galbraith (J. K. Rowling)

- United Kingdom first edition cover
- Author: Robert Galbraith
- Language: English
- Genre: Crime fiction
- Publisher: Sphere Books (Little, Brown and Company)
- Publication date: 20 October 2015
- Publication place: United Kingdom
- Pages: 512
- ISBN: 978-0-7515-6227-9
- Preceded by: The Silkworm
- Followed by: Lethal White

Career of Evil is a crime novel written by British author J.K. Rowling, published under the pseudonym Robert Galbraith. It is the third novel in the Cormoran Strike series of detective novels, and was published on 20 October 2015. It is followed by Lethal White in 2018, Troubled Blood in 2020, The Ink Black Heart in 2022, and The Running Grave in 2023.

== Plot ==
After murdering a woman, an unidentified man stalks Robin Ellacott, whom he sees as part of his plan to exact revenge against private investigator Cormoran Strike. Robin, having worked for Strike for a year, is now a full-time investigator in addition to being his secretary. Strike has developed a relationship with radio presenter Elin but continues to harbour feelings for Robin, whose fiancé Matthew disapproves of the work she is doing.

One day, Robin receives a package containing a woman's severed leg and a message quoting the Blue Öyster Cult song "Mistress of the Salmon Salt (Quicklime Girl)". Strike, who recognises the song as a favourite of his deceased mother, Leda, concludes someone from his past sent the package. He then approaches Detective Inspector Eric Wardle with four possible suspects, three of whom he knew from his time in the SIB:

- Terrence "Digger" Malley, a gangster with a history of mailing severed body parts who went to prison after Strike anonymously testified against him;
- Noel Brockbank, a Gulf War veteran and serial paedophile who blames Strike for taking his family away from him;
- Donald Laing, a former member of the King's Own Royal Border Regiment whom Strike arrested for physically abusing his wife and child, which resulted in a dishonourable discharge and a ten-year prison sentence;
- Jeff Whittaker, Strike's stepfather and the prime suspect in Leda's death by overdose, whom Strike believes to be responsible even though Whittaker was acquitted.

To Strike's annoyance, the police only focus their investigation on Malley because of his previous tactic of mailing body parts. Strike and Robin decide to initiate a parallel investigation, which they begin by reviewing 'unusual correspondence' that had been sent to the office throughout the years, stored in what the pair light-heartedly call the 'nutters' drawer. Found among these are several letters from a young woman who had once requested Strike's help in amputating her own leg as a result of body dysmorphia. They begin to fear that the leg sent to Robin had belonged to this young woman.

== Main characters ==
Cormoran Strike – a veteran of the war in Afghanistan and an ex-SIB investigator who was honourably discharged from the military after losing half of his right leg in a bomb attack.

Robin Ellacott – Strike's assistant (originally his secretary) who has just completed a course in criminal investigation, paid for by Strike.

Donald Laing - a Scot from the Borders, formerly in the military where he and Strike first met.

Noel Brockbank - a former major from Barrow-in-Furness, who had served in both the first Gulf War and Bosnia, before becoming another long-time enemy of Strike's.

Terence 'Digger' Malley - a professional gangster and member of the Harringay Crime Syndicate.

Jeff Whittaker - stepfather of Strike and widower of Strike's mother Leda.

'Shanker' - Nickname of a former flatmate of Strike. He is willing to help Strike and Robin with just about anything in return for money.

Eric Wardle - The police detective inspector originally in charge of the case of the severed leg. He remained friendly with Strike after the events of the previous two novels. He dropped out of the case after the unexpected death of his brother, who was hit by a car.

Roy Carver - Wardle's replacement, who was the detective inspector who had been in charge of the Lula Landry case and who still harboured a grudge against Strike.

Matthew Cunliffe - Robin's fiancé, an accountant who distrusts Robin's relationship with Strike.

== Reception ==
In The Guardian, reviewer Christobel Kent called the novel "daft but enjoyable", with a "narrative dizzying in its proliferation of character, location and detail, and tirelessly, relentlessly specific." She summarised, "the whole is delivered with such sheer gusto – and, crucially, such a confident hold on a deliriously clever plot – that most sensible readers will simply cave in and enjoy it."

On 30 May, Career of Evil was one of the six novels nominated for the title of Theakston Old Peculier crime novel of the year.

== Sequel ==
In March 2017, Rowling posted a clue regarding the title of the fourth book in the series on her Twitter account. One fan guessed the title, with Rowling revealing that the title of her next book will be Lethal White.

On 23 March 2018, Rowling tweeted that she had completed the manuscript for Lethal White.

== In other media ==
=== Television ===
The announcement that the novels would be adapted as a television series for BBC One, starting with The Cuckoo's Calling. was made on 10 December 2014. Rowling acted as executive producer of the series through her production company Brontë Film and Television, along with Neil Blair and Ruth Kenley-Letts. The three event dramas were based on scripts by Ben Richards who wrote The Cuckoo’s Calling, and Tom Edge who wrote The Silkworm and Career of Evil. Michael Keillor directed The Cuckoo’s Calling, Kieron Hawkes directed The Silkworm, and Charles Sturridge directed Career of Evil. Jackie Larkin produced.

The announcement that Tom Burke was set to play Cormoran Strike in Strike was made in September 2016. The announcement that Holliday Grainger would star as Strike's assistant, Robin Ellacott, was made in November 2016.
