= The Hallmarked Man =

2025 detective novel by J. K. Rowling

- First edition in the United Kingdom
- Authors: Robert Galbraith
- Audio read by: Robert Glenister
- Cover artist: Duncan Spilling
- Language: English
- Series: Cormoran Strike
- Release number: 8
- Genre: Crime fiction
- Set in: United Kingdom
- Publisher: Sphere Books
- Publication date: 2 September 2025
- Publication place: United Kingdom
- Media type: Print, Digital, Audiobook
- Pages: 912 (Hardcover)
- ISBN: 978-0-316-58600-9 (Hardcover)
- Preceded by: The Running Grave
- Website: The Hallmarked Man at robert-galbraith.com

The Hallmarked Man is a crime fiction novel written by the British author J. K. Rowling, and published under the pseudonym Robert Galbraith. The eighth novel in the Cormoran Strike detective series, it follows The Running Grave. As with previous books in the series, it features the protagonists Cormoran Strike and Robin Ellacott solving a murder. Themes explored in the plot involve Freemasonry, human trafficking, the silver antiques trade, corruption in the media, secrecy surrounding the military and intelligence services, mental health issues and the interpersonal relationship between the protagonists.

The book was released on 2 September 2025 and received a mixed reception from the press and public. It debuted at the top of the bestseller lists in both the US and UK.

== Plot ==
Decima Mullins hires the agency to investigate the body of "William Wright" found in the vault of Ramsay Silver. Identification is difficult due to mutilation and the outdated security system. The police say that Wright was Jason Knowles, a convicted robber. Mullins thinks Wright was her lover, Rupert Fleetwood. Shanker states that Wright was neither man, that a freemason is behind the execution, and that Knowles was sent to "Barnaby's". Information from Ryan Murphy reveals that Niall Semple and Tyler Powell also fit the profile. A letter encoded with a pigpen cipher says that Wright was "Dick DeLion". Fleetwood's social circle believes he is in New York. The agency receives threatening calls, and Robin is attacked and threatened in Harrods by a masked assailant.

Robin discovers the 1998 murders in Belgium of Reata Lindvall and her daughter Jolanda. The office door is defaced with a letter "G" from the Square and Compasses. A music producer, Calvin Osgood, has his identity stolen. Sapphire Neagle is the only connection between him and the impostor "Oz", whom Wright had emailed. Oz ransacked Wright's apartment of anything personally identifiable with Sofia Medina, a student found dead on North Wessex Downs. Jade Semple tells Strike that her husband became obsessed with Freemasonry after a traumatic brain injury, and that Ralph Lawrence of MI5 took the note he left behind. The stalker threatens Robin again and drops a Masonic dagger. Lawrence warns against investigating Semple, and places Rena Liddell in a psychiatric hold before Strike can interview her.

Strike runs into Nina Lascelles, who tells Dominic Culpepper that Kim Cochran took photos of his wife having an affair. Culpepper writes articles portraying Strike as an abusive womaniser who coerced an escort into sex. Strike reaches out to his father, Jonny Rokeby, whose lawyers quash a false story about Strike fathering Bijou Watkins' daughter. Strike discovers that the encoded letter was from Fiona Freeman, who thinks De Leon was executed by a freemason who uses porn actors and unsuspecting laypeople to fulfil his fetishes. Strike believes that the freemason is Oliver Branfoot, who is colluding with Culpepper and is part of the same Masonic lodge as Malcom Truman, the DCI who investigated the vault case. De Leon is found alive on Sark. "Barnaby's" is deduced to be a scrap yard where bodies are destroyed in the car compactor. Jim Todd, Ramsay Silver's cleaner, is killed by Oz along with his mother. Kim obtains photos that show the body marked with the Cross of Salem.

Dilys Powell and Ian Griffiths explain that Tyler left Ironbridge due to a scandal involving a car crash. Griffiths' daughter Chloe explains that Tyler was aggressive and possessive with women. Faber Whitehead voices his suspicions of Ian Griffiths. Robin pepper-sprays the assailant who is arrested and identified as Wade King. Hussein Mohamed mentions seeing dumbbells with the logo of Wolverhampton Wanderers, which Powell supported. Strike deduces that Griffiths is Oz and runs a trafficking ring. He killed Lindvall and passed off Jolanda as Chloe. When Powell tried to rescue Chloe, Todd got him a job at Ramsay Silver and lured him to the vault, where Griffiths murdered him. Medina aided Griffiths at both Ramsay Silver and Powell's apartment, after which she was killed. Strike, Barclay and Wardle subdue the ring at Griffiths' house and discover Sapphire chained in the basement. It is revealed that Griffiths was impersonating Chloe, who was murdered and buried in the basement after Griffiths got her pregnant.

Robin and Midge find the stolen silver behind a wall at Ramsay Silver. Kim works with Farah Navabi and Branfoot to foil Strike's investigation, but becomes the subject of one of Branfoot's sex tapes. Fergus Robertson's piece in The Sunday Telegraph exposes Branfoot, and Culpepper is fired for fabricating articles. Information from Tara Jenson helps Robin find Fleetwood in Sardinia. He reveals that Decima is his half-sister via Dino Longcaster's affair with Fleetwood's mother, and Robin convinces him to reconcile. Using information from Rena Liddell, Semple's body is found where he committed suicide in Regent's Canal. At the funeral, Ralph Lawrence reveals the circumstances of Ben Liddell's execution by Daesh. Spurred by Murphy's impending proposal, Strike confesses his feelings to Robin.

== Characters ==
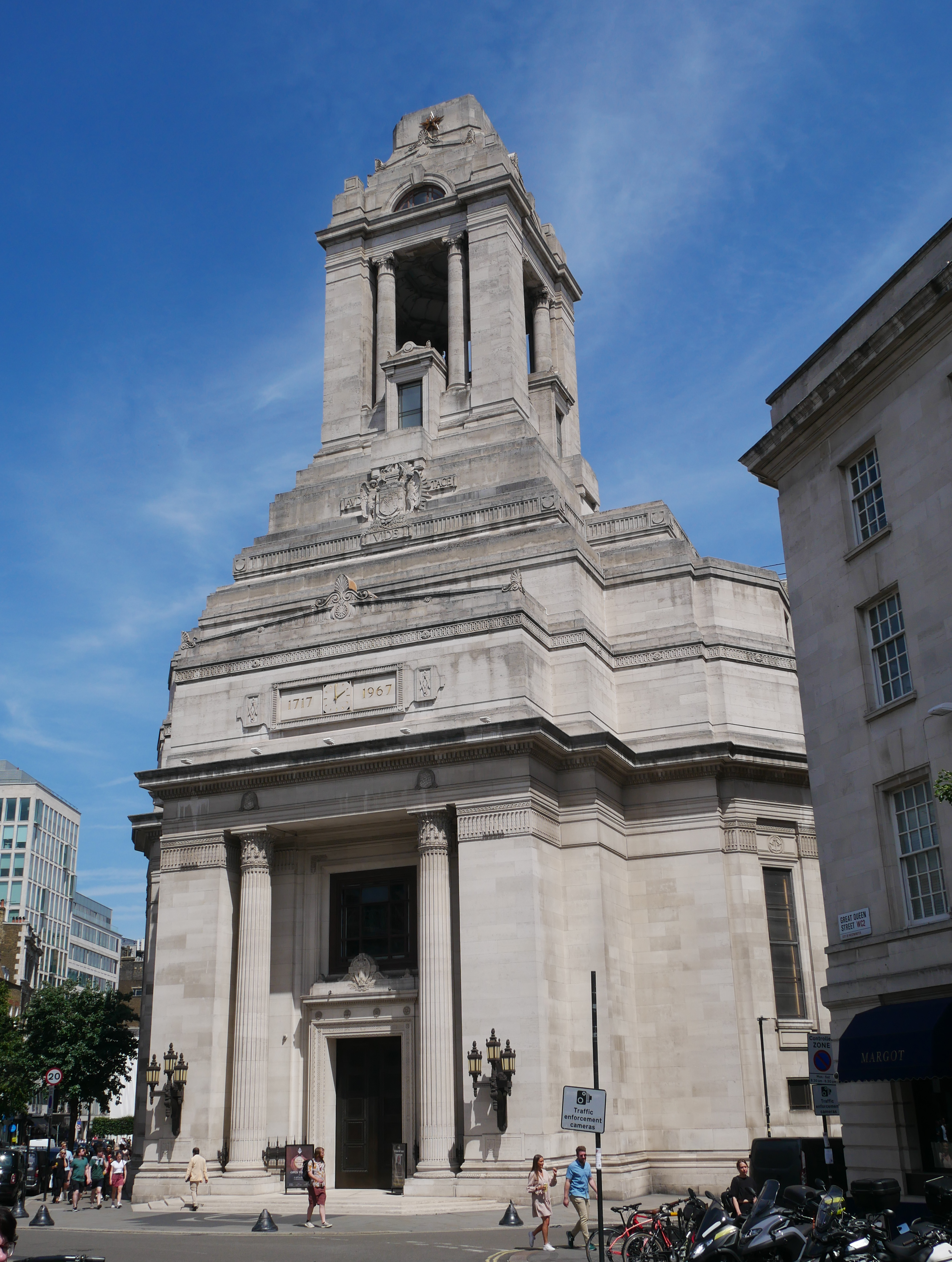
Ramsay Silver is located behind Freemasons' Hall, London

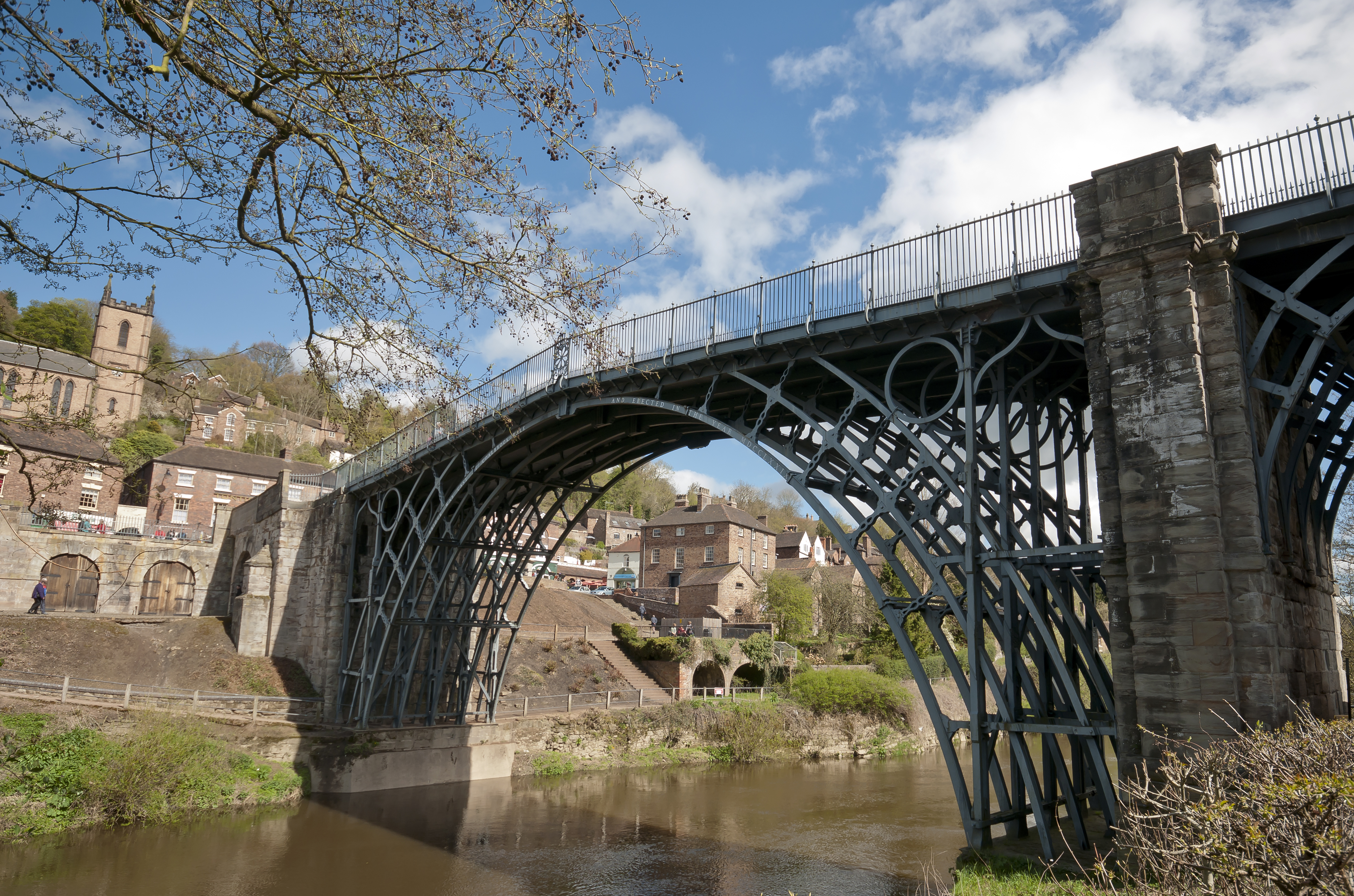
Part of the investigation and the conclusion of the case take place in the village of Ironbridge

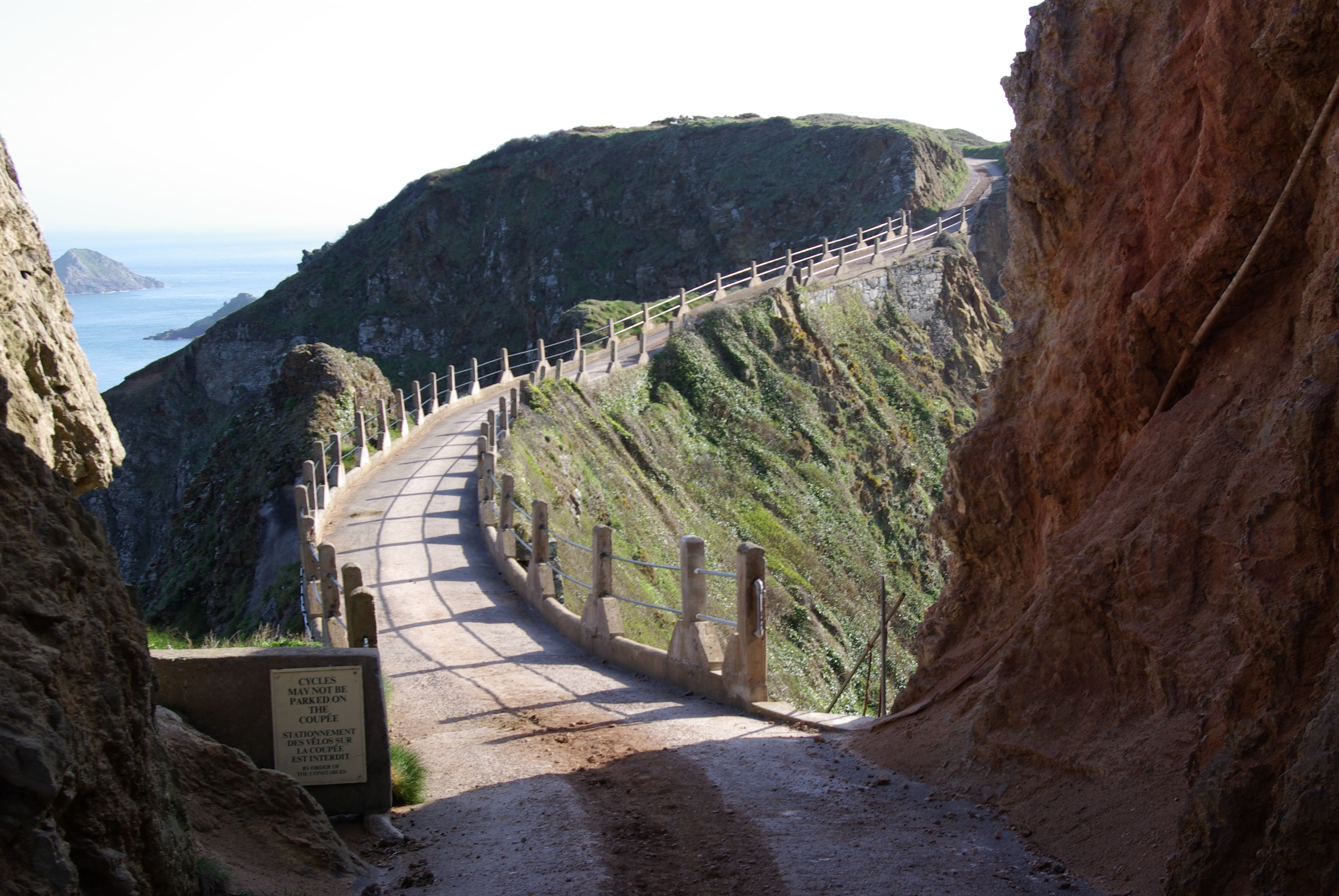
La Coupée on Sark, where Strike and Robin find Danny De Leon

=== Main ===
- Cormoran Strike: An ex-SIB investigator who co-runs a private detective agency alongside Robin.
- Robin Ellacott: Strike's partner in the detective agency.

=== Antagonists ===
==== Trafficking ring ====
- Ian Griffiths: Neighbour of Tyler Powell; leader of the trafficking ring
- Wynn Jones: Tyler Powell's friend
- Todd Jameson (Jim Todd): Cleaner at Ramsay Silver; part of the trafficking ring in Belgium
- Wade King: Robin's gorilla-masked stalker; former bandmate of Ian Griffiths
- Mickey Edwards: Member of the ring
- Darren Pratt: Tyler Powell's friend

==== Branfoot's operation ====
- Lord Oliver Branfoot: A former MP, media personality and Freemason
- Danny De Leon (Dick DeLion): Porn actor who blackmailed Branfoot
- Craig Wheaton: Porn director, associate of Branfoot
- Fiona Freeman (Fyola Fay): Porn actress who worked with De Leon; Craig Wheaton's girlfriend
- Kim Cochran: Former police detective and sub-contractor; later works with Farah Navabi and Branfoot

=== People of interest ===
==== Rupert Fleetwood's social circle ====
- Decima Mullins (nee Longcaster): Restaurateur; Client of the agency; Valentine Longcaster's sister; stepsister of Strike's late ex-fiancée Charlotte Campbell
- Rupert Fleetwood: Decima Mullins' boyfriend; cousin of Sacha Legard; Dino Longcaster's illegitimate son
- Sacha Legard: Actor; Charlotte's half-brother
- Valentine Longcaster: Decima Mullin's brother; Charlotte's stepbrother
- Cosima Longcaster: Socialite; Valentine and Decima's younger half-sister
- Dino Longcaster: Club owner; patriarch of the Longcaster family; biological father of Rupert Fleetwood
- Anjelica Wallner: Rupert Fleetwood's aunt
- Albie Simpson-White: Rupert Fleetwood's friend; Harrods employee; former employee of the Longcasters' club
- Zacharias Lorimer: Rupert Fleetwood's roommate
- Tara Jenson: Mother of Charlotte Campbell and Sacha Legard; ex-wife of Dino Longcaster

==== Other people of interest ====
- Kenneth Ramsay: Owner of Ramsay Silver
- Pamela Bullen-Driscoll: Owner of Bullen & Co.; Kenneth Ramsay's sister-in-law
- Jade Semple: Wife of Niall Semple, a missing SAS veteran
- Dilys Powell: Tyler Powell's grandmother
- Hussein Mohamed: Uber driver; William Wright's neighbour
- Daz and Mandy: William Wright's neighbours
- Sapphire Neagle: A missing school student
- Calvin Osgood: Music producer; victim of identity theft
- Rena Liddell: Sister of Ben Liddell, late member of the SAS and Niall Semple's friend
- Gretchen Schiff: Sofia Medina's roommate
- Tia Thompson: Sapphire Neagle's classmate
- Faber Whitehead: Architect; father of Hugo Whitehead, who was killed when Tyler Powell's car crashed

=== Strike and Robin's social circle ===
==== The Strike and Ellacott Detective Agency ====
- Sam Barclay: A Glaswegian private investigator; a sub-contractor
- Dev Shah: A sub-contractor
- Midge Greenstreet: A sub-contractor
- Eric Wardle: Former police detective; new sub-contractor
- Pat Chauncey: Office manager

==== Friends and family ====
- Lucy: Strike's half-sister, Leda Strike's daughter
- Shanker: A career criminal, Strike's childhood friend and informant
- Linda and Michael Ellacott: Robin's parents
- Jonathan, Stephen and Martin Ellacott: Robin's brothers
- Jenny and Carmen: Partners of Robin's brothers
- Jonny Rokeby: Rock star; Strike's estranged father
- Ilsa Herbert: Lawyer, Strike's school friend
- Graham Hardacre: Strike's SIB colleague
- Ryan Murphy: A CID detective; Robin's boyfriend
- Prudence Donleavy: Psychologist; Strike's half-sister; Jonny Rokeby's daughter

==== Former romantic interests ====
- Nina Lascelles: A former fling of Strike from The Silkworm; cousin to the journalist Dominic Culpepper
- Matthew Cunliffe: Robin's ex-husband
- Bijou Watkins: A brief fling of Strike's from The Running Grave

=== Law enforcement ===
- DCI Northmore: In charge of the silver vault case
- DCI Iverson: Working on the silver vault case; former fling of Ryan Murphy
- Ralph Lawrence: A member of MI5; acquaintance of Angela Darwish from The Ink Black Heart

== Development ==
Freemasonry, Masonic symbols like the Square and Compass, and the letter G feature in the plot.

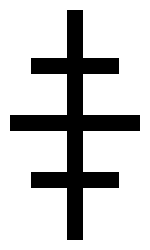
William Wright's body is branded with the Cross of Salem, a symbol of the leadership of Freemasonry

=== Background ===
Rowling started writing the novel after the release of The Running Grave in September 2023. She announced the title of the book through X on 15 March 2024. Public speculation about the setting and plot of the novel grew due to images and posts on Rowling's X account. These included Iron Bridge, Wild Court (a street behind Freemasons' Hall in London), the island of Sark in the Channel Islands, Crieff in Scotland and the Savoy Hotel in London.

Rowling partly confirmed these speculations when she said during an interview that a few chapters would be set on Sark. She also teased a few plot details, revealing that she had written about an encounter that had been foreshadowed for years. On 17 December 2024, Rowling announced that she had finished writing the novel.

The involvement of the Masons was further hinted at when the cover, which was leaked through Apple books on 23 May 2025, featured Freemasons' Hall. Retail listings later revealed the inclusion of a new character called Decima Mullins and confirmed the involvement of Freemasonry. Rowling revealed in an interview that Masonic concepts like the Pigpen Cipher would be plot points.

=== Publication ===
The novel was published by Sphere Books in the UK and by Mulholland Books in the USA. Both Mulholland and Sphere are imprints of Little, Brown and Company (part of the Hachette Book Group), which has published all Rowling's adult fiction, including The Casual Vacancy.

The novel has hardback, paperback, large-print paperback, eBook and audiobook editions. The audiobook is narrated by Robert Glenister, who also narrated all the previous books in the series. The cover art was created by Duncan Spilling, who has designed the covers for all the books in the series.

Early copies of the hardcover edition started going out on 27 August. The book was released to the public on 2 September.

== Sales and reception ==
The book sold 53,207 copies in the UK during its first week on sale, outselling the previous two entries in the series. It made its debut at the top of the UK Top 50, and also landed at the top of the hardcover fiction sales lists in the US.

Press reception was mixed. A critic described the book as another strong, emotionally engaging entry in the series. Praise was given to the construction and handling of multiple intertwining plot lines. Points of criticism were the lack of resolution for the romantic tension between the protagonists and the handling of colloquialisms in dialogue. The length of the book was noted as excessive, although it is shorter than the three previous entries in the series.

== Sequel ==
On 16 December 2024, Rowling revealed that she was already making plans for the ninth book in the series. Rowling has previously stated that she intends to end the series after ten books. On 13 February 2026, Rowling revealed via X that the title of the book would be Sleep Tight, Evangeline.
