= The Silkworm =

2014 crime fiction novel by J. K. Rowling

- United Kingdom first edition cover
- Author: Robert Galbraith
- Language: English
- Genre: Crime fiction
- Publisher: Sphere Books (Little, Brown & Company)
- Publication date: 19 June 2014
- Publication place: United Kingdom
- Pages: 454
- ISBN: 978-1-4087-0402-8
- Preceded by: The Cuckoo's Calling
- Followed by: Career of Evil

The Silkworm is a crime fiction novel written by British author J. K. Rowling, published under the pseudonym Robert Galbraith. It is the second novel in the Cormoran Strike series of detective novels and was published on 19 June 2014. It was followed by Career of Evil in 2015, Lethal White in 2018,Troubled Blood in 2020, The Ink Black Heart in 2022 and The Running Grave in 2023.

== Plot summary ==
Eight months after solving the Lula Landry case, Cormoran Strike is asked by Leonora Quine to locate her novelist husband Owen, a controversial figure whose attempts to recreate the success of his first novel have failed. Owen disappeared around the same time his latest book, Bombyx Mori, was leaked. The book has been deemed unpublishable due to its mixture of sexual assault, torture, and cannibalism as well as its slanderous depiction of the people in Owen's life. Strike sets out interviewing the others portrayed in the manuscript: Owen's lover Kathryn Kent and her ward Phillip "Pippa" Midgley, both aspiring writers, Quine's agent Elizabeth Tassel, editor Jerry Waldegrave, publisher Daniel Chard and Quine's former friend Michael Fancourt, a famous author.

As the investigation proceeds, Strike's relationship with his assistant Robin Ellacott grows strained, as she feels neglected by him and he feels unwilling to put her in a position where she is forced to choose between her job and her fiancé Matthew. The animosity is tempered when Strike finds Owen's body, which has been mutilated, doused in acid and posed to resemble the killing of the protagonist at the end of Bombyx Mori. Metropolitan Police later arrest Leonora for the murder, prompting Strike to set out to clear her name. Robin's relationship with Matthew comes under pressure when his mother dies and their wedding is delayed, and she almost misses the funeral to help Strike. She later confronts Strike about his intentions only to be warned that she will be asked to do things Matthew will not like if she becomes an investigator.

With evidence against Leonora mounting, Strike focuses on Fancourt, whose character in the manuscript is inconsistent and seems contrary to his relationship with Owen. Several years earlier, after Fancourt's wife Elspeth wrote a novel that was panned by critics, an anonymous parody's release prompted her to kill herself. Fancourt accused Owen of authoring the parody and Tassel of enabling him. Strike soon deduces Bombyx Mori is a metaphor for someone else's life, its author pretending to be Owen, and he engineers a plan to catch the killer. With his half-brother Alexander's help, he approaches Fancourt at a party and asks to speak to him in private. When Tassel joins them, Strike reveals that he knows Tassel wrote the fake Bombyx Mori and killed Owen.

Owen had been blackmailing Tassel, a failed author herself, for twenty years over her authorship of the parody of Elspeth's novel. When he approached her with the original concept for Bombyx Mori, Tassel concocted an elaborate plan. She conspired with Owen to stage his disappearance, rewrote Bombyx Mori, killed Owen, and framed Leonora for the murder. Tassel attempts to flee, only to be caught in a plan devised by Strike with Robin and Alexander and arrested.

The following week, Leonora is released from prison, Fancourt acknowledges the original Bombyx Mori manuscript's literary value and plans to write an introduction for its publication, and Strike tells Robin that he has enrolled her in investigative training courses as a Christmas gift.

== Characters ==
=== Main characters ===
- Cormoran Strike – A veteran of the Afghanistan war who was discharged after losing half of his leg in a bomb attack. He is a minor celebrity, thanks in part to his notorious rock star father and his solving of a high-profile murder.
- Robin Ellacott – Strike's assistant and secretary who harbours a lifelong fascination with the world of criminal investigation. Now taking on a full-time role at Strike's agency, she aspires to become an investigator in her own right.

=== Bombyx Mori characters ===
- Owen Quine – an author once hailed as an avant-garde writer and an early "literary rebel". He has spent decades trying to recreate the success of his first novel, Hobart's Sin, to no avail. He is regarded as narcissistic and insecure in the extreme and only tolerated because of the traces of unrealized potential in his work.
  - Quine appears in Bombyx Mori as Bombyx, an aspiring author whose genius is undisputed, unappreciated, and unsubstantiated, prompting him to seek out his idols only to discover that they seek to abuse him before eating him alive.
- Leonora Quine – Quine's wife, who becomes the prime suspect in his murder. She spends almost all her time caring for their intellectually disabled adult daughter, Orlando.
  - Leonora appears as Succuba, a demon in the body of a hideous woman who places Bombyx in bondage and repeatedly rapes him.
- Kathryn Kent – Quine's girlfriend and an author of "fantasy erotica" that has mostly been rejected by the London publishing community.
  - Kathryn appears as Harpy, a beautiful woman with a hideous deformity, implied to be a crude and cruel metaphor for breast cancer.
- Pippa Midgley – a young transgender woman, birth name Phillip, preparing for gender reassignment surgery. She became enamoured with Quine after taking a creative writing course he taught and mentorship toward the autobiography Pippa was planning. Rejected by her birth mother, Pippa grew close to Kathryn over their shared connection to Owen and literary aspirations.
  - Pippa appears as Epicoene, adopted daughter of Harpy, who seeks to escape her clutches with Bombyx. Bombyx responds positively until she sings in a hideous voice (an allusion to vocal feminization exercises), which he finds horrifying.
- Elizabeth Tassel – a failed writer and university classmate of Michael Fancourt who became a literary agent. She lives and works on the fringe of the London literary community, which she deeply resents, and expresses her anger by bullying her staff.
  - Tassel appears as The Tick, a parasitic woman who cultivates Bombyx's talent to leech off him.
- Jerry Waldegrave – Quine's long-suffering editor, who is one of the few people willing to tolerate him. His reputation is ruined by Quine's behaviour, leading to the breakdown of his marriage and his descent into alcoholism.
  - Jerry appears as The Cutter, a horned, troll-like creature that ruthlessly destroys Bombyx's work. He carries a bloodied sack implied to carry an aborted foetus and attempts to drown other creatures.
- Michael Fancourt – a contemporary of Quine who went on to become a bestselling author. He maintains literature is an art form, and that art can only be considered as such when it provokes social discussion; however, this is little more than an excuse for his deeply misogynistic opinions.
  - Michael appears as Vainglorious, a famous author and Bombyx's idol. He is revealed to be a charlatan, torturing his wife Effigy to fuel his own creativity and passing her torment off as art.
- Daniel Chard – the president of Roper Chard, a London publishing house specialising in modern literature. He has poor social skills and is implied to be a closeted homosexual.
  - Daniel appears as Phallus Impudicus, a man who murders a beautiful male writer to steal his talent and later violates the corpses with his diseased penis.

=== Other characters ===
- Matthew Cunliffe – Robin's fiancé, who disapproves of her work with Strike. Despite considerable tension from this, Robin eventually tells him about her lifelong dream of being a detective and Matthew accepts her doing it although he doesn't much like it.
- Richard Anstis – a detective with the Metropolitan Police who was involved in the incident that cost Strike his leg. Strike considers him a capable investigator, but lacking in imagination.
- Orlando Quine – Quine's intellectually-disabled daughter. She is the only person in Quine's life who does not appear in the Bombyx Mori manuscript, and it is implied that she is the only person the author genuinely cares about.
- Lucy – Strike's half-sister on his mother's side, and the only member of his family that he has any regular contact with. Despite being his younger sister, she tends to mother him, encouraging him to settle down and start a family, much to Strike's consternation.
- Alexander 'Al' Rokeby – Strike's half-brother on his father's side, and the only member of his father's side of the family with whom he has any contact.
- Nina Lascelles – a junior editor at Roper Chard who helps Strike acquire the Bombyx Mori manuscript. She becomes enamoured with him and pursues a romantic relationship with him, which is not reciprocated.
- Joe North – an American writer and friend of Quine and Fancourt. He died of AIDS while writing about his experiences living with the disease. After lying abandoned for twenty years, the house where North died became the scene of Quine's murder.
- Christian Fisher – the editor of a niche publishing house who leaks the Bombyx Mori manuscript.
- Dominic Culpepper – an opportunistic tabloid journalist who hires Strike to find evidence of wrongdoing among the rich and powerful. He expresses surprise that Strike does not resort to phone-hacking to acquire evidence.
- Charlotte Campbell Ross – Strike's on-again, off-again former flame. Following the breakdown of their relationship, she has become engaged to another man, but continues to taunt Strike from afar.

== Reception ==
Val McDermid from The Guardian gave the novel a positive review, but criticised the descriptions of the different London settings, which she considered superfluous: "I suspect that having spent so many books describing a world only she knew has left her with the habit of telling us rather too much about a world most of us know well enough to imagine for ourselves". The novel was also nominated for a Gold Dagger Award at the Crime Writers' Association Daggers 2015.

== In other media ==
=== Television ===
On 10 December 2014, it was announced that the novels would be adapted as a television series for BBC One, starting with The Cuckoo's Calling. Rowling executive produced the series through her production company Brontë Film and Television.

In September 2016, it was announced that Tom Burke was set to play Cormoran Strike, and in November 2016 it was announced that Holliday Grainger had been cast as Strike's assistant, Robin Ellacott. Additional cast of the adaptation include Kerr Logan as Matthew Cunliffe, Monica Dolan as Leonora Quine, Lia Williams as Elizabeth Tassel, Jeremy Swift as Owen Quine, Dorothy Atkinson as Kathryn Kent, Dominic Mafham as Jerry Waldegrave, Tim McInnerny as Daniel Chard, Peter Sullivan as Michael Fancourt, Sargon Yelda as DI Richard Anstis, Sarah Gordy as Orlando Quine and Natasha O'Keeffe as Charlotte Campbell.

The two-episode dramatisation of The Silkworm initially aired in September 2017.
