= Strike (TV series) =

2017 British crime drama series

- The Running Grave (2026)
- Also known as: C. B. Strike
- Genre: Crime drama Detective fiction
- Based on: Cormoran Strike by Robert Galbraith
- Written by: Ben Richards (series 1); Tom Edge (series 2–7)
- Directed by: Michael Keillor (series 1); Kieron Hawkes (series 2); Charles Sturridge (series 3); Sue Tully (series 4–7)
- Starring: Tom Burke; Holliday Grainger
- Opening theme: "I Walk Beside You" by Beth Rowley
- Composer: Adrian Johnston
- Country of origin: United Kingdom
- Original language: English
- No. of series: 6
- No. of episodes: 19

Production
- Executive producers: Ben Richards; Neil Blair; Ruth Kenley-Letts; J. K. Rowling; Elizabeth Kilgarriff; Tom Edge; Tommy Bulfin
- Producers: Jackie Larkin; Alex Rendell
- Running time: 57–59 minutes
- Production companies: Brontë Film and Television, BBC

Original release
- Network: BBC One
- Release: 27 August 2017 – present

Strike (also known as C. B. Strike internationally) is a British crime drama television programme based on the book series Cormoran Strike by J. K. Rowling under the pseudonym Robert Galbraith. Starring Tom Burke and Holliday Grainger, it was first broadcast on BBC One on 27 August 2017.

The programme follows Cormoran Strike (Burke), a war veteran turned private detective operating out of a tiny office in London's Denmark Street, who uses his unique insight and his background as a Special Investigation Branch investigator to solve complex cases that have eluded the police along with his assistant, subsequently business partner, Robin Ellacott (Grainger).

Nineteen episodes across six series have been broadcast to date, each series adapting a novel: The Cuckoo's Calling (2013), The Silkworm (2014), Career of Evil (2015), Lethal White (2018), Troubled Blood (2020), and The Ink Black Heart (2022) respectively.

A seventh series, based on the book The Running Grave started filming in Winter 2025, and is scheduled for broadcast on BBC on the 6th December 2026.

== Cast and characters ==
=== Main cast ===
- Tom Burke as Cormoran Blue Strike
- Holliday Grainger as Robin Venetia Ellacott

=== Recurring cast ===
- Kerr Logan as Matthew Cunliffe
- Ben Crompton as Shanker
- Natasha O'Keeffe as Charlotte Campbell
- Killian Scott/ Felix Scott as DI Eric Wardle
- Ann Akin as Vanessa Ekwensi
- Sargon Yelda as DI Richard Anstis
- Caitlin Innes Edwards as Ilsa Herbert
- Kierston Wareing as Leda Strike
- Jack Greenlees as Sam Barclay
- Sarah Sweeney as Lucy
- Ruth Sheen as Pat Chauncey
- Tupele Dorgu as Midge Greenstreet
- Stephen Hagan as DCI Richard Murphy

=== Guest cast ===
==== S1: The Cuckoo's Calling ====
- Siân Phillips as Lady Yvette Bristow
- Martin Shaw as Tony Landry
- David Avery as Nico Kolovas-Jones
- Leo Bill as John Bristow
- Tara Fitzgerald as Tansy Bestigui
- Amber Anderson as Ciara Porter
- Kadiff Kirwan as Guy Somé
- Bronson Webb as Evan Duffield
- Elarica Johnson as Lula Landry
- Brian Bovell as Derrick Wilson

==== S2: The Silkworm ====
- Dorothy Atkinson as Kathryn Kent
- Monica Dolan as Leonora Quine
- Dominic Mafham as Jerry Waldegrave
- Tim McInnerny as Daniel Chard
- Peter Sullivan as Andrew Fancourt
- Jeremy Swift as Owen Quine
- Lia Williams as Liz Tassel
- Sarah Gordy as Orlando Quine

==== S3: Career of Evil ====
- Andrew Brooke as Niall Brockbank
- Emmanuella Cole as Alyssa
- Jessica Gunning as Holly Brockbank
- Matt King as Jeff Whittaker
- Neil Maskell as Donald Laing

==== S4: Lethal White ====
- Nick Blood as Jimmy Knight
- Robert Glenister as Jasper Chiswell
- Joseph Quinn as Billy Knight
- Sophie Winkleman as Kinvara Chiswell
- Christina Cole as Izzy Chiswell
- Adam Long as Raff Chiswell
- Natalie Gumede as Lorelei Bevan
- Saffron Coomber as Flick Pardue
- Danny Ashok as Aamir Malik
- Robert Pugh as Geraint Winn

==== S5: Troubled Blood ====
- Jonas Armstrong as Saul Morris
- Linda Bassett as Joan Nancarrow
- Fionnula Flanagan as Oonagh Kennedy
- Sutara Gayle as Kim Sullivan
- Abigail Lawrie as Margot Bamborough
- Ian Redford as Ted Nancarrow
- Andy de la Tour as Nico 'Mucky' Ricci
- Sophie Ward as Anna Phipps
- Kierston Wareing as Leda Strike
- Michael Byrne as Roy Phipps
- Anna Calder-Marshall as Janice Beattie
- Cherie Lunghi as Gloria Conti
- Carol MacReady as Irene Hickson
- Madhav Sharma as Dr Dinesh Gupta
- Samuel Oatley as DI George Layborn
- Kenneth Cranham as Dennis Creed
- Robin Askwith as Steve Douthwaite
- Christina Cole as Izzy Chiswell
- Dayo Koleosho as Samhain Athorn

==== S6: The Ink Black Heart ====
- Jacob Abraham as Josh Blay
- Ewan Bailey as Nils De Jung
- Kevin Bishop as Wally Cardew
- Ellise Chappell as Kea Niven
- Jack Donoghue as Gus Upcott
- Emma Fielding as Katya Upcott
- Mirren Mack as Edie Ledwell
- Christian McKay as Inigo Upcott
- James Nelson-Joyce as Pez Pierce
- Luke Norris as Phillip Ormond
- David Westhead as Grant Ledwell

==== S7: The Running Grave ====
- James Fleet as Sir Colin Edensor
- Nichola McAuliffe as Shelley Heaton
- Keeley Forsyth as Mazu Wace
- Fabian McCallum as Will Edensor
- John Lynch as Jonathan Wace
- Nell Barlow as Becca Pirbright
- Tracy Anne Green as Vivienne
- Mark Dexter as Giles Harmon
- Curtis Kemlo as Kevin Pirbright
- Anne Lacey as Sheila Kennett
- Nicola Sloane as Sally Edensor
- Natalia Tena as Bijou Watkins

== Production and development ==
On 10 December 2014 it was announced that the Cormoran Strike novel series, written by J. K. Rowling under the pseudonym Robert Galbraith, would be adapted for television by the BBC for broadcast on BBC One, beginning with The Cuckoo's Calling. Two years later it was confirmed that the series would total seven episodes of sixty minutes, with shooting to begin in London in the autumn of 2016. Tom Burke was announced in the role of Cormoran Strike in September 2016, and Holliday Grainger in the role of Robin Ellacott in November 2016.

Ben Richards adapted The Cuckoo's Calling, and Tom Edge adapted The Silkworm, Career of Evil, Lethal White, Troubled Blood, The Ink Black Heart and The Running Grave. Richards stated that the series is "very different tonally and visually from other crime dramas". He compared Strike to the British detective television series Morse. Similarly, Edge commented that "people use old-fashioned as a pejorative word, but to me that's part of why these books, and, I hope, the TV series, works so well."

== Episodes ==
Series	Episodes	Originally released		Average UK viewers (millions)
Series	Episodes	First released	Last released	Average UK viewers (millions)
1	3	27 August 2017	3 September 2017	8.45
2	2	10 September 2017	17 September 2017	8.35
3	2	25 February 2018	4 March 2018	8.08
4	4	30 August 2020	13 September 2020	7.82
5	4	11 December 2022	19 December 2022	6.92
6	4	16 December 2024	24 December 2024	5.25
7	5	6 December 2026	2026	TBA

=== Series 1: The Cuckoo's Calling (2017) ===
The Cuckoo's Calling was released on DVD on 27 November 2017.

No. overall	No. in series	Title	Directed by	Written by	Original release date	UK viewers (millions)
1	1	"The Cuckoo's Calling: Part 1"	Michael Keillor	Ben Richards	27 August 2017	8.89
2	2	"The Cuckoo's Calling: Part 2"	Michael Keillor	Ben Richards	28 August 2017	8.28
3	3	"The Cuckoo's Calling: Part 3"	Michael Keillor	Ben Richards	3 September 2017	8.18

=== Series 2: The Silkworm (2017) ===
The Silkworm was released on DVD on 19 February 2018.

No. overall	No. in series	Title	Directed by	Written by	Original release date	UK viewers (millions)
4	1	"The Silkworm: Part 1"	Kieron Hawkes	Tom Edge	10 September 2017	8.67
5	2	"The Silkworm: Part 2"	Kieron Hawkes	Tom Edge	17 September 2017	8.02

=== Series 3: Career of Evil (2018) ===
Career of Evil was released on DVD on 16 April 2018.

No. overall	No. in series	Title	Directed by	Written by	Original release date	UK viewers (millions)
6	1	"Career of Evil: Part 1"	Charles Sturridge	Tom Edge	25 February 2018	8.43
7	2	"Career of Evil: Part 2"	Charles Sturridge	Tom Edge	4 March 2018	7.72

=== Series 4: Lethal White (2020) ===
Lethal White was released on DVD on 23 November 2020.

No. overall	No. in series	Title	Directed by	Written by	Original release date	UK viewers (millions)
8	1	"Lethal White: Part 1"	Sue Tully	Tom Edge	30 August 2020	8.61
9	2	"Lethal White: Part 2"	Sue Tully	Tom Edge	31 August 2020	7.58
10	3	"Lethal White: Part 3"	Sue Tully	Tom Edge	6 September 2020	7.85
11	4	"Lethal White: Part 4"	Sue Tully	Tom Edge	13 September 2020	7.22

=== Series 5: Troubled Blood (2022) ===
No. overall	No. in series	Title	Directed by	Written by	Original release date	UK viewers (millions)
12	1	"Troubled Blood: Part 1"	Sue Tully	Tom Edge	11 December 2022	8.07
13	2	"Troubled Blood: Part 2"	Sue Tully	Tom Edge	12 December 2022	6.34
14	3	"Troubled Blood: Part 3"	Sue Tully	Tom Edge	18 December 2022	6.86
15	4	"Troubled Blood: Part 4"	Sue Tully	Tom Edge	19 December 2022	6.41

=== Series 6: The Ink Black Heart (2024) ===
No. overall	No. in series	Title	Directed by	Written by	Original release date	UK viewers (millions)
16	1	"The Ink Black Heart: Part 1"	Sue Tully	Tom Edge	16 December 2024	6.08
17	2	"The Ink Black Heart: Part 2"	Sue Tully	Tom Edge	17 December 2024	5.44
18	3	"The Ink Black Heart: Part 3"	Sue Tully	Tom Edge	23 December 2024	4.92
19	4	"The Ink Black Heart: Part 4"	Sue Tully	Tom Edge	24 December 2024	4.54

=== Series 7: The Running Grave (2026) ===
No. overall	No. in series	Title	Directed by	Written by	Original release date	UK viewers (millions)
20	1	"The Running Grave: Part 1"	Sue Tully	Tom Edge	6 December 2026	TBD
21	2	"The Running Grave: Part 2"	Sue Tully	Tom Edge	7 December 2026	TBD
22	3	"The Running Grave: Part 3"	Sue Tully	Tom Edge	December 2026	TBD
23	4	"The Running Grave: Part 4"	Sue Tully	Tom Edge	December 2026	TBD
24	5	"The Running Grave: Part 5"	Sue Tully	Tom Edge	December 2026	TBD

== Reception ==
The Cuckoo's Calling received generally positive reviews from critics. Rotten Tomatoes gave it an approval rating of 85%, based on 20 reviews, and an average score of 6.8/10. The website's critics’ consensus reads "The TV adaptation of C. B. Strike delivers an entertaining detective series that faithfully and effectively adheres to genre tropes." Morgan Jeffery of Digital Spy, who reviewed the first episode, praised both Burke's and Grainger's performances, calling Burke's performance "a revelation".

Similarly, the adaptation of The Silkworm was met with positive reviews, with critics again praising Burke's and Grainger's performances. However the first episode was criticised for showing a suicide scene on World Suicide Prevention Day, making some viewers claim that this scene was insensitive.

Career of Evil holds an 88% approval rating on Rotten Tomatoes, based on 8 reviews, and an average score of 7/10.

Lethal White holds a 73% approval rating on Rotten Tomatoes, based on 11 reviews, and an average score of 5.6/10.

Troubled Blood holds a 93% approval rating from audiences on Rotten Tomatoes, based on 26 reviews.

The Ink Black Heart holds a 51% approval rating from audiences on Rotten Tomatoes, based on 20 reviews.

After the Ink Black Heart began airing on HBO on 23 January 2025 the show was one of the top ten streamed series on the streaming service Max following the broadcast of the second episode.

== International broadcast ==
The programme premiered on 1 June 2018 in the United States on Cinemax and in Canada on HBO Canada. Following the fourth series, the programme was exhibited in the United States on HBO.
