= Cormoran Strike =

Series of books by J. K. Rowling as Robert Galbraith

- Cormoran Strike played by Tom Burke in Strike: The Running Grave Tv Series
- The Cuckoo's Calling (2013); The Silkworm (2014); Career of Evil (2015); Lethal White (2018); Troubled Blood (2020); The Ink Black Heart (2022); The Running Grave (2023); The Hallmarked Man (2025); Sleep Tight, Evangeline (forthcoming)
- Author: J. K. Rowling (as Robert Galbraith)
- Country: United Kingdom
- Language: English
- Genre: Crime fiction, mystery
- Publisher: Sphere Books
- Published: 4 April 2013–present
- Media type: Print (hardback and paperback); Audiobook; E-book
- No. of books: 8

Cormoran Strike is a series of crime fiction novels written by British author J. K. Rowling under the pen name Robert Galbraith. The story chronicles the cases of the fictional private detective Cormoran Strike and his business partner Robin Ellacott. Eight novels have so far been published in a planned series of ten. The eighth novel, titled The Hallmarked Man, was released on 2 September 2025. A ninth, titled Sleep Tight, Evangeline was announced by Rowling on 13 February 2026. As of February 2024, the series has sold more than 20 million copies worldwide and was published in more than 50 countries, being translated into 43 languages.

The novels are adapted into the television programme Strike, which began airing on BBC One in the United Kingdom in August 2017.

== Novels ==
1. Galbraith, Robert (4 April 2013). The Cuckoo's Calling. Sphere. ISBN 978-1-4087-0399-1. 464 pages
2. Galbraith, Robert; Rowling, J. K. (19 June 2014). The Silkworm. Sphere. ISBN 978-1-4087-0402-8. 454 pages
3. Galbraith, Robert (20 October 2015). Career of Evil. Sphere. ISBN 978-0-7515-6227-9. 512 pages
4. Galbraith, Robert; Rowling, J. K. (18 September 2018). Lethal White. Sphere. ISBN 978-0-7515-7285-8. 656 pages
5. Galbraith, Robert (15 September 2020). Troubled Blood. Mulholland Books/Little, Brown. ISBN 978-0-316-49893-7. 944 pages
6. Galbraith, Robert (30 August 2022). The Ink Black Heart. Mulholland Books/Little, Brown. ISBN 978-0-316-41303-9. 1024 pages
7. Galbraith, Robert (26 September 2023). The Running Grave. Mulholland Books/Little, Brown. ISBN 978-0-316-57210-1. 960 pages
8. Galbraith, Robert (2 September 2025). The Hallmarked Man. Mulholland Books/Little, Brown. ISBN 978-0-316-58600-9. 912 pages
9. Galbraith, Robert (release date TBA). Sleep Tight, Evangeline.

== Characters ==
=== Protagonists ===
Cormoran Strike
- First appearance: The Cuckoo's Calling
- Created by: Robert Galbraith
- Portrayed by: Tom Burke

In-universe information
- Gender: Male
- Occupation: Private detective
- Family: Jonathan 'Jonny' Rokeby (father); Leda Strike (mother); Maimie (half-sister); Gabriella Rokeby (half-sister); Daniella Rokeby (half-sister); Alexander 'Al' Rokeby (half-brother); Edward Rokeby (half-brother); Prudence Donleavey (half-sister); Lucy (half-sister); Switch Whittaker (half-brother); Jeff Whittaker (stepfather); Jack (nephew); Luke (nephew); Adam (nephew); Sylvie Donleavey (niece); Ted Nancarrow (uncle); Joan Nancarrow (aunt by marriage)
- Nationality: British

- Cormoran Blue Strike: An ex-SIB investigator who runs a private detective agency. His biological father, Jonny Rokeby, is a renowned rock star who had an affair with Strike's mother, model and 'super groupie' Leda Strike. Strike is a war veteran who suffered a below-knee amputation while serving in Afghanistan.

Robin Ellacott
- First appearance: The Cuckoo's Calling
- Created by: Robert Galbraith
- Portrayed by: Holliday Grainger

In-universe information
- Gender: Female
- Occupation: Private detective
- Family: Linda Ellacott (Mother); Michael Ellacott (Father); Stephen (Brother); Martin Ellacott (Brother); Jonathan (Brother); Matthew Cunliffe (Ex-Husband)
- Nationality: British

- Robin Venetia Ellacott; She begins the series as a temporary secretary, but becomes a partner in the detective agency alongside Strike.

=== Secondary characters ===
- Matthew Cunliffe: Robin's fiancé, later husband, eventually ex-husband.
- Lucy: Strike's younger half-sister on his mother's side.
- Jonny Rokeby: Strike's famous rock-star father.
- Leda Strike: Strike's late mother, a famous model and a rockstar 'supergroupie'. She died of a heroin overdose when Strike was 20.
- Charlotte Campbell (Ross): Strike's ex-fiancée, wealthy and mercurial.
- Eric Wardle: A detective with the Metropolitan Police.
- Roy Carver: A detective with the Metropolitan Police.
- Richard Anstis: A detective with the Metropolitan Police.
- Linda Ellacott: Robin's mother, first appearing in the second novel.
- Alexander 'Al' Rokeby: One of Strike's half-brothers on his father's side.
- Shanker: Strike's friend from the times he was living with his mother Leda. A career criminal.
- Nick and Ilsa Herbert: Strike's school friends who appear beginning in the second novel.
- Ted and Joan Nancarrow: Strike and Lucy's aunt and uncle.
- Samuel 'Sam' Barclay: A Scottish subcontractor who begins working with the agency in the fourth novel.
- Michelle 'Midge' Greenstreet and Dev Shah: detectives who (along with Barclay) work as subcontractors with the Strike and Ellacott Detective Agency.
- Pat Chauncey: Secretary at the Detective Agency.
- Ryan Murphy: A detective with the Metropolitan Police who starts dating Robin in the sixth novel.

== Television adaptation ==
In December 2014, it was announced that the novel series would be adapted for television by the BBC. In September 2016, Tom Burke was confirmed as having been cast as Cormoran Strike. Holliday Grainger was cast as Robin Ellacott later in November. Filming of seven hour-long episodes of the Cormoran Strike television series began in November 2016. The series was picked up by HBO for distribution in the United States and Canada. It premiered on 27 August 2017 on BBC.
