= Party Party =

Party Party or variants may refer to

== Arts and entertainment ==
- Party Party (film), a 1983 British comedy, and the title of a song by Elvis Costello from the soundtrack
- "Party, Party", a song by Paul McCartney from the 1989 album Flowers in the Dirt
- "Party Party Party", a song by Andrew W.K. from the 2007 soundtrack of Aqua Teen Hunger Force Colon Movie Film for Theaters
- Party Party: Thelma Remix, a 2008 remix album by Thelma Aoyama
- The Party Party (radio series), a 1987 British political comedy
- Party/Party, a 2005 American reality TV series
- "Party, Party" (Frasier), a 1998 episode of TV series Frasier

== Politics ==
- Party of the Future, a Dutch political party sometimes known as The Party Party
- Party! Party! Party!, a 1989 short-lived joke political party in the Australian Capital Territory
- Party Party of Rhode Island, a United States political party
