= Lethal White =

2018 detective novel by J. K. Rowling

- Author: Robert Galbraith
- Language: English
- Genre: Crime fiction
- Publisher: Sphere Books (Little, Brown and Company)
- Publication date: 18 September 2018 (United Kingdom)
- Publication place: United Kingdom
- Pages: 656
- ISBN: 0751572853
- Preceded by: Career of Evil
- Followed by: Troubled Blood

Lethal White is a crime novel written by British author J. K. Rowling, published under the pseudonym Robert Galbraith. It is the fourth novel in the Cormoran Strike series, and was published on 18 September 2018.

== Background ==
Lethal White is preceded by The Cuckoo's Calling, The Silkworm, and Career of Evil; there are tentative plans to follow it with at least five more stories. Rowling announced the completion of the manuscript on 23 March 2018, after approximately two years of writing, and the book was released on 18 September 2018. Lethal White follows the private detective Cormoran Strike and his partner Robin Ellacott. The story begins with a prologue following immediately after the conclusion of Career of Evil detailing events taking place at Robin's wedding reception.

== Plot ==
At Robin Ellacott's wedding to Matthew Cunliffe, Cormoran Strike's capture of the Shacklewell Ripper the night before is widely known, except by Robin. She realises Matthew has surreptitiously blocked Strike's number on her phone, which results in a row between the new spouses. Before Strike leaves the wedding, Robin accepts his offer of working as a salaried partner in the detective agency.

One year later, Strike has grown his detective agency to the point where he needs to hire more investigators. He receives an unsolicited visit from Billy Knight, a young man with a history of mental illness who claims to have witnessed a child's murder and the burial of the body in woodland some years before, but is unable to provide any details before he runs out of Strike's office. While trying to establish Billy's identity, Strike meets Billy's older brother Jimmy and Jimmy's girlfriend Flick, radical left-wing activists who claim that Billy is unstable and unreliable.

Strike's meeting with Jimmy draws the attention of Jasper Chiswell, the Minister for Culture, whom Strike knew of from investigating the combat death of his son Freddie. Chiswell has been blackmailed by Jimmy and hires Strike to investigate; he identifies Geraint Winn, the husband of a political enemy, as Jimmy's likely partner. Chiswell does not reveal what he is accused of, but claims that what he did was legal "at the time". Robin goes undercover in Chiswell's office to carry out surveillance on Winn, who has a neighbouring office, and whose wife is a government minister. The undercover assignment places more strain on Robin's marriage. She meets Chiswell's daughter Izzy, who manages his office, his illegitimate son Raphael, who also works there, and his second wife Kinvara. By bugging Winn's office, Robin discovers that Winn has been embezzling money from his and his wife's charity, and Chiswell uses this knowledge to stop Winn's blackmail.

Chiswell summons Strike and Robin to a house that he keeps in the city for business, but on arrival, they find Chiswell's body, apparently dead from suffocation and an overdose of anti-depressants. The Metropolitan Police rule his death a suicide, but Izzy is convinced that Kinvara is responsible, again hiring Strike to investigate. Strike believes that the mysterious blackmail is connected to Chiswell's death and eventually learns that Chiswell and Jack Knight, Jimmy and Billy's late father, built gallows for export before the European Union banned the export of torture and execution equipment from member states. Two sets of these gallows were sold to Zimbabwe, where one set was stolen by rebels and used in the murder of a British student. The gallows could be traced to Chiswell because Billy had carved the nearby White Horse of Uffington into it.

Meanwhile, Robin continues to struggle with post-traumatic stress disorder a year after her encounter with the Shacklewell Ripper, while Matthew continues to interfere with her work. She finally separates from Matthew and moves out when she finds proof that he has been having an affair with Sarah Shadlock — the same woman he cheated on Robin with at university. Strike's ex-girlfriend Charlotte Ross née Campbell, now pregnant, reappears and unsuccessfully pursues Strike.

Strike learns that Chiswell had transferred title of his property to his grandson before his death. In a document accompanying his will, however, he wrote Kinvara could keep anything in their country house and live on the family estate for the rest of her life. Strike and Robin notice the country house contains a painting titled Mare Mourning and realise that it may be a lost George Stubbs artwork depicting a mare mourning a foal that died of lethal white syndrome. If its provenance were to be established, it would probably be worth over £20 million. Strike identifies Chiswell's killer: Raphael, who had never been accepted by the family but had worked for an art dealer. Raphael had tipped off Flick about a cleaning job at Chiswell's, expecting that she would find out about the gallows sales and tell Jimmy, who then demanded half of the profits. Raphael also seduced and conspired with Kinvara to kill Chiswell, intending to persuade Kinvara to make him the beneficiary of the wealth she'd receive from the painting.

Kinvara confesses on being interrogated by police, but Raphael sends Robin texts purporting to be from Matthew, luring her into a trap. He keeps her alive to interrogate her about the investigation; Robin stalls for time by outlining everything in detail and Raphael realises that there is too much evidence against him. Strike realises Raphael's duplicity when he notices that the text messages to Robin came from a phone number similar to the burner phone numbers used in the blackmail case. He learns from Izzy that Raphael had a girlfriend with a houseboat and manages to arrive at the houseboat with police just as Raphael is about to kill Robin and then himself.

In the aftermath, Strike, Robin, and Izzy meet Billy to discuss the "murder" he witnessed as a child. Izzy reveals that Billy actually saw Freddie choke a young Raphael until he passed out, followed by the burial of a small horse that Freddie had killed in a separate act of cruelty. Strike and Robin then leave together.

== Characters ==
- Cormoran Strike – A war veteran who was honourably discharged after losing half of his leg in a bomb attack. He has since become a private detective. He is a minor celebrity, thanks in part to his rock star father and his solving of high-profile murders.
- Robin Ellacott – Strike's former secretary, who completed a course in criminal investigation, paid for by Strike, and became his business partner while at her wedding. She is a survivor of a rape and attempted murder and is extremely sensitive regarding sex crimes.
- Matthew Cunliffe – Robin's long-time boyfriend and new husband.
- Charlotte Campbell Ross – Strike's ex-girlfriend who is currently married and expecting.
- Nick Herbert – An old friend of Strike's, with whom he occasionally stays to avoid publicity.
- Ilsa Herbert – An old classmate of Strike's, now married to Nick.
- Billy Knight – A young man who claims to have witnessed a murder some years prior.
- Jimmy Knight – Billy's brother, a left-wing activist.
- Flick Purdue – Jimmy Knight's girlfriend and fellow activist.
- Jasper Chiswell – A mercurial and scandal-plagued Member of Parliament serving as the Minister for Culture.
- Freddie Chiswell – Jasper's late son, whose death in combat was investigated by Strike.
- Izzy Chiswell – Jasper's hard-working but under-appreciated daughter.
- Raphael – Jasper's illegitimate son, who was recently released from prison after killing a woman while driving under the influence.
- Kinvara Chiswell – Jasper Chiswell's young, unstable, histrionic second wife.
- Geraint Winn – The husband of Minister for Sport Della Winn, and one of Jasper Chiswell's political enemies.
- Vanessa Ekwensi – A police detective who is friends with Robin.

== In other media ==
Lethal White was adapted as part of the television series starring Tom Burke as Cormoran Strike and Holliday Grainger as Robin Ellacott. Filming began in September 2019. The first episode was broadcast on 30th August 2020.
