= I Want Candy (film) =

2007 film by Stephen Surjik

- Theatrical release poster
- Directed by: Stephen Surjik
- Written by: Pete Hewitt; Phil Hughes; Jamie Minoprio; Jonathan M. Stern; Fred Wolf (Note: credited under "additional dialogue"); Jimmy Carr
- Based on: An original idea by: Piers Thompson; Olivia Glazebrook
- Produced by: Barnaby Thompson; Piers Thompson
- Starring: Tom Riley; Tom Burke; Carmen Electra; Eddie Marsan; Michelle Ryan; Mackenzie Crook; Jimmy Carr
- Cinematography: Crighton Bone (Note: Director of photography Nigel Black started filming, but was later replaced by Bone)
- Edited by: Alex Mackie
- Music by: Murray Gold
- Production companies: Ealing Studios; Thema SA; Grosvenor Park Films; Sky Movies; Fragile Films
- Distributed by: Buena Vista International (United Kingdom); Magnet Releasing (United States); Fragile Film Distribution (international)
- Release dates: 23 March 2007 (United Kingdom); 9 September 2008 (United States)
- Running time: 87 minutes
- Countries: United Kingdom; Luxembourg; United States
- Language: English
- Budget: $1.5 million
- Box office: $2.4 million

I Want Candy is a 2007 sex comedy film directed by Stephen Surjik and starring Tom Riley, Tom Burke and Carmen Electra. It revolves around a group of university students who go in search of funding for their feature film and end up having to rewrite it and make it into a pornographic film.

The film was shot on a low budget in West London in June and July 2006 and was picked up by Buena Vista International for wide national release. Scenes in the fictional Leatherhead University were filmed on the campus of Brooklands College in Weybridge, Surrey.

== Cast ==
- Tom Riley as Joe Clark
- Tom Burke as John "Baggy" Bagley
- Carmen Electra as Candy Fiveways
- Eddie Marsan as Doug Perry
- Michelle Ryan as Lila Owens
- Mackenzie Crook as Mr. Dulberg
- Felicity Montagu as Valerie Clark
- Philip Jackson as Stephen Clark
- Jimmy Carr as Video Store Guy
- John Standing as Michael de Vere
- Carl Prekopp as Vlad
- Rasmus Hardiker as Christi
- Colin Michael Carmichael as Gabi
- Stephanie Blacker as Tiffany Thomas
- Giles Alderson as Carl
- Sid Mitchell as Robby
- Martin Savage as Priest
- Nick Nevern as Angry Mourner
- Miranda Hart as Working Title Receptionist
- Molly Hallam as Smashing Films Receptionist
- Rhys Swinburn as Graham Rose
- David Armand as Clive Purves
- Tom Meeten as Sergeant Major
- Natalie Walter as Lucy
- Irene Alano as Mai Ling
- Richard Glover as Professor
- Marc Pickering as Sam
- Kristian Kiehling as German Guy
- Shelley Longworth as MC Awards
- Simon Woods as Film Actor

== Reception ==
=== Critical response ===
On Rotten Tomatoes the film has an approval rating of 56% with an average rating of 5.40/10 based on reviews from 9 critics.

Channel 4 gave it a positive review. Empire Magazine called it "A warm-hearted, smutty comedy that, if predictable, has a likeable cast and plenty of zip." Time Out wrote: "despite the usual failings of a cash-strapped British film – unconvincing subplots, continuity errors, ropey bit-part actors – this cheerful exploitation of the Full Monty formula still entertains."

=== Box office ===
The film entered the UK top 10 at number seven and moved to number 11 the following week.

== Home media ==
I Want Candy was released on DVD in the United Kingdom on 20 August 2007 by Buena Vista Home Entertainment. Special features included deleted scenes, bloopers and a "making of" featurette.
