= The Party Party (radio series) =

British BBC political comedy radio series

The Party Party is a British radio series broadcast on BBC Radio 4 in 1987. The six-part series was a political comedy set in 1993, written by Moray Hunter, and performed by Robert Glenister, Rory Bremner, Clive Mantle, Hugh Laurie, Morwenna Banks, and Robin Driscoll. Set in a town called "Microcosm", characters included P, Three, Lord Knight, Penny, Dan, and Norman, of whom the latter three were being taught radio techniques by Mr. Mann. They had the "Minister of Honesty", the "Minister of Flannel", and the "Department of Secrets".
