= Cross of Salem =

Variant of the Christian cross

The Cross of Salem, also known as a pontifical cross because of its similarity to the papal cross, is a cross used in Christianity. It is also similar to a patriarchal cross but has an additional crossbar below the main crossbar that is equal in length to the upper crossbar. The Cross of Salem is also similar to the Orthodox cross and is used by the supreme leadership of Scottish and York Rite Freemasonry.

== See also ==
- Christian cross
