= Troubled Blood =

2020 detective novel by J. K. Rowling

- UK first edition cover
- Author: Robert Galbraith
- Language: English
- Genre: Crime fiction
- Publisher: Sphere Books
- Publication date: 15 September 2020
- Publication place: United Kingdom
- Pages: 944
- ISBN: 0751579939
- Preceded by: Lethal White
- Followed by: The Ink Black Heart

Troubled Blood is a crime novel written by British author J. K. Rowling, published under the pseudonym Robert Galbraith. The novel is the fifth in the Cormoran Strike series, and was released on 15 September 2020.

The story follows private detective Cormoran Strike and his business partner Robin Ellacott as they investigate the disappearance of Margot Bamborough, a doctor who vanished in 1974. The book explores themes of change, loss, and absence, and the changing face of feminism.

Upon release, Troubled Blood became a bestseller and won the Crime and Thriller Book of the Year Award at the British Book Awards. The novel has been adapted as part of the Strike television series.

== Plot ==
Troubled Blood begins in August 2013 and ends on Robin's 30th birthday on 9 October 2014. While visiting his terminally ill aunt Joan in Cornwall, Strike is approached by a woman who wants to hire Strike's firm to investigate the disappearance of her mother, Margot Bamborough, a general practitioner in Clerkenwell, London, almost 40 years previously, on 11 October 1974. As a result of their previous successes, business partners Strike and Robin now employ three contract investigators and an office manager. Both are dealing with their own problems: Strike over his aunt's illness, suicide threats from his ex-fiancée Charlotte (now a married mother of two), and the attempts of his half-siblings to get him to attend a party honouring his rock star biological father Jonny Rokeby; Robin over Matthew's intransigence in their divorce, her continuing PTSD, and her unsettled personal life, brought into clearer focus by her brother and his wife having their first child.

The police's principal suspect in Margot's disappearance was a currently incarcerated serial killer named Dennis Creed. The daughter, Anna, and her wife give the firm a one-year contract to try to trace information; however, because the small firm has three other ongoing cases, it takes several months to run down the surviving witnesses and investigators or their children. During the year, Joan dies from cancer, Matthew gives up and grants Robin the divorce after he impregnates his mistress Sarah Shadlock, Charlotte attempts suicide and calls Strike to tell him goodbye (although Strike's quick reaction gets help to her in time), and the heavy work schedule combined with a lack of communication about all of the issues contributes to many personal misunderstandings within the firm, including arguments between Strike and Robin and the termination of one of the contract investigators for instances of inappropriate behaviour toward Robin.

In August 2014, although the firm is still trying to trace leads, the client and her wife terminate the contract at the end of the month, two weeks before the allotted year. Despite this, Strike and Robin continue to investigate. There are three breakthroughs with the case: Strike locates an elusive patient of Margot's, Steve Douthwaite; a receptionist, who claims she was the last person to see Margot alive, agrees to speak to Strike and Robin; and, through Robin's inventiveness and persistence in attempting to secure an interview with Creed behind Strike's back, Strike is granted permission to interrogate Creed in Broadmoor Hospital on the 19th of September. Strike outwits Creed and this leads to the discovery of the remains of another victim of Creed, Louise Tucker, bringing closure and relief to her father. Robin and Strike then use evidence from the original police investigation and their subsequent investigation to find Margot's body and identify her killer: Janice Beattie, a nurse who worked for Margot's practice. Margot had correctly begun to suspect Janice had been poisoning Douthwaite and was implicated in the apparent suicide of his lover, and after examining Janice's son, Margot realised Janice was poisoning him also. Strike deduces that Janice is a serial killer who has murdered many more victims over decades.

An avalanche of publicity centred on Strike and Robin follows the discovery of the remains of Louise Tucker and Margot Bamborough and the arrest of Janice Beattie. Robin and Strike both move out of their homes temporarily to avoid journalists. The novel ends on Robin's 30th birthday, with Strike (in contrast to the generic last-minute gifts he gave Robin at Christmas and on her previous birthday) buying her thoughtful and personalised gifts and taking her to the Ritz for champagne; enigmatically, Strike smiles to himself as he remembers a conversation with his friend Dave Polworth about the competing demands of career, romantic relationships, and marriage.

== Characters ==
=== Main ===
- Cormoran Strike – A private detective. He is a minor celebrity, thanks in part to his rock star father and his solving of high-profile murders. He is also a war veteran.
- Robin Ellacott – Strike's business partner, trained in criminal investigation. She is a survivor of a rape and attempted murder.
- Margot Bamborough – A doctor who disappeared in 1974.
- Anna Phipps – Margot Bamborough and Roy Phipps's adult daughter.

=== Suspects and witnesses ===
- Dennis Creed – A serial killer, now in Broadmoor Hospital.
- Nico "Mucky" Ricci – A gangster who owned a strip club, now in a nursing home
- Luca Ricci – Son of Nico, now a vicious London gangster.
- Gwilherm Athorn – A mentally ill man who claimed to have killed Margot.
- Roy Phipps – Margot's husband in 1974, a haematologist who married Anna's nanny after Margot's disappearance.
- Cynthia Phipps – Anna's former nanny, now married to Roy (thus, Anna's stepmother).
- Paul Satchwell – A photographer and artist who was Margot's former boyfriend.
- Joseph Brenner – An older doctor who was a partner in Margot's GP practice.
- Dinesh Gupta – An older doctor who was a partner in Margot's GP practice.
- Janice Beattie – The district nurse in Margot's GP practice.
- Irene Bull – A receptionist in Margot's GP practice.
- Gloria Conti – A receptionist in Margot's GP practice.
- Steve Douthwaite – One of Margot's patients.
- Wilma Baylis – The cleaner in Margot's GP practice and her House.
- Oonagh Kennedy – Margot's long-time friend, whom she was supposed to be meeting when she disappeared.

=== Other ===
- Matthew Cunliffe – Robin's estranged husband, from whom she becomes divorced during the novel.
- Charlotte Campbell Ross – Strike's ex-girlfriend who is currently married and mother to twin toddlers.
- Lucy – Cormoran Strike's younger maternal half-sister.
- Lucy's sons – Luke, Jack and Adam.
- Ted Nancarrow – Leda Strike's brother; Cormoran and Lucy's uncle.
- Joan Nancarrow – Ted's wife; Cormoran and Lucy's aunt.
- Dave "Chum" Polworth – Strike's oldest friend, who lives near Ted and Joan in Cornwall.
- Al Rokeby – Cormoran Strike's younger paternal half-brother.
- Prudence Donleavy – Cormoran Strike's paternal half-sister (Jonny Rokeby's other illegitimate child).
- Jonny Rokeby – Cormoran Strike's estranged father, a famous rock star.
- Bill Talbot – The late police inspector who had led the investigation into Margot's death before a mental breakdown.
- Nick Herbert – An old London school friend of Strike's, now a gastroenterologist.
- Ilsa Herbert – An old classmate of Strike's and Polworth's, now a lawyer and married to Nick.
- Max Priestwood – An actor and Robin's current flatmate.
- Pat Chauncey – The agency's office manager.
- Sam Barclay – A contract investigator.
- Saul Morris – A contract investigator.
- Kim Sullivan – Anna's wife.
- "Shanker" – Nickname of a former flatmate of Strike. He is willing to help Strike and Robin with just about anything in return for money.

== Background ==
Speaking after the release of the novel, Rowling described its main themes as "change, loss and absence" and that the book examines the "changing face of feminism". She also stated that the character of Dennis Creed was loosely based on real-life killers Jerry Brudos and Russell Williams.

== Reception ==
Troubled Blood sold 64,633 copies in its first week and was the top selling book in the UK. This was the biggest single week of sales for any Galbraith title and almost double the launch-week volume of the previous Strike Lethal White. It retained the number one spot in its second week on sale, selling a further 25,430 copies. In May 2021, the novel won the Crime and Thriller Book of the Year Award at the British Book Awards. In the same month, the book was shortlisted for the two Crime Writers' Association Awards, in the Ian Fleming Steel Dagger category, for thrillers first published in the UK and in the Gold Dagger category, for the best crime novel first published in the UK. The Wall Street Journal included the novel in their 'Best Books of 2020: Mysteries' year-end list.

In The Daily Telegraph, the reviewer Jake Kerridge complimented the novel's character development and pleasant reading, while finding it unnecessarily long and less exciting than previous books of the series. Clare Clark, writing for The Guardian, gave the novel a positive review, pointing out its plot full of "simmering emotional tension" and "terrific fun", while acknowledging that it was excessively long and "hardly a hair-raising ride". Joan Smith in The Sunday Times said "the story is injected with a powerful sense of urgency...in this magnificent addition to the Strike novels". Tom Nolan, from The Wall Street Journal, deemed it "a formidable entertainment from the first page to the last". Writing for The Washington Post, Bill Sheehan praised the development of the series central characters alongside the novel's narrative and called Rowling "a natural, supremely confident storyteller". Allan Massie, writing for The Scotsman, described the novel as "very enjoyable" and praised Rowling as an author who "enjoys writing". Kelly Lawler, reviewing for USA Today, called the novel a "laborious read" and "simply not good", paling in comparison to previous books in the series. Stephen King praised the novel, calling Rowling "a wonderful storyteller and a gifted stylist".

Some media outlets regarded the male villain who dresses as a woman in order to kill women as transphobic, given the author's past comments on transgender people. Laura Bradley, reviewing in The Daily Beast, wrote that there were "pernicious anti-trans tropes" in the novel, while Jake Kerridge observed that the book's "moral seems to be: never trust a man in a dress".

Nick Cohen, writing for The Spectator, argued that the transphobia accusations were baseless and slanderous, noting that Dennis Creed is investigated along with a dozen other suspects. He also stated that the book does not engage in the politics of women-only spaces and access to gender reassignment treatments. Alison Flood, writing for The Guardian, expressed similar views, arguing that people who have not read the book were making wrong assumptions based on a single review. Allan Massie, writing for The Scotsman, stated of the character of Creed that "there is no suggestion that he was transgender".

== In other media ==
Troubled Blood was adapted as part of the television series starring Tom Burke as Cormoran Strike and Holliday Grainger as Robin Ellacott. Filming began in February 2022.
