= The Running Grave =

2023 crime fiction novel by J. K. Rowling

- UK first edition cover
- Author: Robert Galbraith (J. K. Rowling)
- Language: English
- Genre: Crime fiction
- Publisher: Sphere Books
- Publication date: 26 September 2023
- Publication place: United Kingdom
- Pages: 960
- ISBN: 978-0-316-57210-1
- Preceded by: The Ink Black Heart
- Followed by: The Hallmarked Man

The Running Grave is a crime novel written by British author J. K. Rowling, published under the pseudonym Robert Galbraith. It is the seventh novel in the Cormoran Strike series, and was published on 26 September 2023.

== Plot ==
Sir Colin Edensor, a retired civil servant, approaches Cormoran Strike and Robin Ellacott's detective agency seeking assistance extricating his son Will from the Universal Humanitarian Church (UHC), an organization claiming to be a benevolent charity but often called a cult. Strike realizes that he had lived at the former commune where the cult’s headquarters are now located, Chapman Farm near Aylmerton in Norfolk, during his transient childhood with his mother and sister Lucy. Lucy confesses to Strike that she was molested there, to his shock. Robin volunteers to go undercover at the current-day Chapman Farm to gather intelligence about the cult and attempt to get Will out. From former cult members they gather information about the cult, which starves and physically exhausts new members as part of indoctrination, and coerces women into complying with all sexual demands.

At Chapman Farm, Robin meets the heads of the UHC, including founder and leader Jonathan Wace; his wife Mazu Wace, who procured Lucy for the doctor who molested her; and Becca Pirbright, sister of former UHC member Kevin Pirbright, who left the cult and provided information to Sir Colin Edensor before apparently committing suicide. Meanwhile, Strike looks into the circumstances of this and other mysterious deaths connected to the UHC, including multiple suicides, and the 1995 drowning of the Waces’ seven-year-old daughter Daiyu, who is now venerated as the "Drowned Prophet" in the UHC's mythology.

Robin finds Will at the farm, and realizes he has fathered a child there, Qing, with a teenaged girl named Lin. However, he rejects Robin’s attempts to get closer to him. Another church leader, Jonathan’s son Taio Wace, shows sexual interest in Robin, which she struggles to rebuff due to the church’s doctrines on sex. Church leaders use demonstrations of apparent supernatural ability as part of church indoctrination and ritual, and dole out harsh punishments to those who question or challenge church teachings. In a barn, she finds Polaroid pictures featuring young people in pig masks performing sexual acts, and is able to smuggle the pictures out to Strike. Under the punishing food and work routines, Robin begins to lose weight and suffer nervous symptoms.

On the outside, Strike misses and continues to struggle with his feelings for Robin, who is dating policeman Ryan Murphy. He is contacted multiple times by a deteriorating Charlotte, his ex-girlfriend, but refuses contact despite her claim that she has cancer. He makes contact with more former members of the UHC, including Jonathan’s resentful adult daughter Abigail, and interviews witnesses to Daiyu’s drowning. He learns of strange behavior by former cult member Cherie Gittins, who was with Daiyu on the beach the day she drowned, but is unable to track her down. He learns that Charlotte has committed suicide after leaving him several voicemails, and struggles with guilt and regret.

After barely escaping sexual coercion by both Taio and Jonathan Wace, Robin is targeted by a jealous Becca and worries that she will be discovered. She builds a rapport with Emily Pirbright, the disgraced sister of Becca and Kevin, who tells her that Daiyu did not drown. Robin then tricks Will into speaking alone, where she reveals the news of his mother’s death a year prior; he reacts angrily and hits her. Robin is punished by drowning in the church’s baptismal pool and then locked in a small box for hours; on release, she is forced to care for a deformed and dying child named Jacob. On being pressured again to sleep with Taio, she makes a run for it, narrowly escaping the grounds with Strike. They report Jacob’s condition to the police, but the UHC moves him and covers it up before he can be found.

The church targets Robin, involving the police and accusing her of molesting Jacob. As she recovers from her ordeal, Robin joins Strike in interviewing Cherie Gittins, who has changed her name and moved to the suburbs. Cherie insists Daiyu drowned, and commits suicide shortly after they leave. Will appears at the detectives’ office with his daughter, having escaped the farm. He initially refuses to contact his family or speak out against the UHC, but begins to recover as the detectives agree to help extricate Lin; he reveals that Jacob died shortly after Robin's escape. Robin arranges a supervised therapy session between Will and fellow former UHC member Flora Brewster, in which Flora reveals the church's "Divine Secrets", including Jonathan Wace's corrective rape of mentally ill women and lesbians; the burial of unreported dead at the farm; and a large-scale child trafficking operation with the church members’ unregistered births.

Strike and Robin pressure their police contacts and coordinate a crackdown on the UHC’s illicit activities, leading to a police raid of the farm. Robin pursues Becca to the UHC's London temple as Strike confronts Abigail, positing that she murdered Daiyu out of jealousy, disposed of the body using pigs, and faked her death via drowning, with the coerced help of Cherie and other teenage cult members. At the temple, Robin finds Mazu Wace hiding out with a UHC member's kidnapped baby, and overpowers her, revealing how Daiyu died and Becca’s longtime childhood manipulation after witnessing Daiyu leave the dormitory long before her alleged death.

In the aftermath of the church’s breakdown, Jonathan Wace is arrested, while Becca remains faithful to the now-discredited UHC. Will is reunited with Lin and his family, and they rename their daughter Sally in honour of his late mother. Strike meets with Charlotte's sister Amelia, where they discuss Charlotte's suicide note and last words, finding peace in letting her go. Just as Robin is leaving for a trip with her boyfriend Ryan Murphy, Strike indirectly confesses his love for her.

== Characters ==
=== Main ===
- Cormoran Strike is a private detective. He is a minor celebrity, thanks in part to his rock star father and his solving of high-profile murders. He is also a war veteran who lost his leg in an explosion. He is now making an effort to lose weight, improve his diet, and switch from smoking to vaping, after previously having more unhealthy habits.
- Robin Ellacott is Strike's former assistant, now business partner, trained in criminal investigation. She is a survivor of a rape and attempted murder, and her current task of infiltrating a cult brings her unsettlingly close to similar activity.

=== Recurring ===
- Pat Chauncey – The agency's office manager, a chain-smoker who has also shifted to vaping, like Strike
- Sam Barclay – An excellent Scottish contract investigator
- Michelle "Midge" Greenstreet – A former Greater Manchester Police officer turned contract investigator who is a lesbian and an excellent baker
- Dev Shah – A contract investigator
- Charlotte Campbell Ross is Strike's neurotic and unstable ex-fiancée, a beautiful socialite and supermodel, whose issues worsen in this instalment of the series.
- Lucy is Strike's maternal half sister, who has three sons. Strike is fond of the middle son, Jack. Lucy reveals a terrible secret to Strike about their time in the Aylmerton Community as children.
- Ted Nancarrow is Strike and Lucy's maternal uncle, who is developing traits of dementia, later diagnosed as Alzheimer's disease.
- Prudence Donleavy is Strike's paternal half-sister and works as a therapist from her home.
- Nick Herbert – An old London school friend of Strike's, now a gastroenterologist
- Ilsa Herbert – An old classmate of Strike's, now a lawyer and married to Nick. Strike and Robin are godparents to their son Benjy
- "Shanker" is the nickname of a contact of Strike's in the criminal underworld. They are close because Strike's mother Leda took Shanker in as a boy when he was in danger and he became part of the family. He is willing to help Strike and Robin with just about anything in return for money.
- Eric Wardle is a police detective inspector who shares information with Strike.
- Ryan Murphy is a CID officer romantically involved with Robin, much to Strike's jealousy.
- Fergus Robertson is a journalist who sometimes shares information with Strike.

=== Other characters ===
- Clive Littlejohn a suspiciously quiet subcontractor of the detective agency, formerly employed by a competing agency.
- Sir Colin Edensor, a retired civil servant who hires Strike and Ellacott's agency to investigate the Universal Humanitarian Church (UHC) and get his son out of it
- Will Edensor, autistic son of Sir Colin, who has joined the UHC and is living on its farm, refusing contact with his family
- Kevin Pirbright, a former member of the UHC who was writing a book exposing it as a cult, but died of a gunshot before it was published
- Louise Pirbright, mother of Kevin, still a member of the UHC living on the farm
- Becca Pirbright, sister of Kevin, high-status UHC member who enforces the church's rules on other members
- Emily Pirbright, other sister of Kevin, with lower church status than Becca
- Jonathan Wace, the manipulative founder and leader of the UHC, known as "Papa J" to other members
- Jennifer Wace, Jonathan's first wife, who drowned back in the 1980s
- Mazu Wace, the sinister and dreaded wife of Jonathan, one of the UHC leaders; lived on the farm before it was a church, when it was a commune (the Aylmerton Community) which ended when its leaders were arrested for child sexual abuse
- Daiyu Wace, daughter of Mazu who was said to have drowned at age 7 in 1995 on the same beach as Jennifer Wace, being known as the "Drowned Prophet" afterward and becoming a major part of the UHC belief system
- Taio Wace, son of Jonathan, high-status UHC member who enforces the church's rules on other members
- Jiang Wace, son of Jonathan, with lower status in the church than some of his other children
- Cherie Gittins (birth name Carine Makepeace, also known as Cherry Curtis and Carrie Curtis Woods), who reportedly took Daiyu swimming the day she drowned, then left the church soon after
- Abigail Glover, daughter of Jonathan and Jennifer Wace, now a firefighter
- Patrick, lodger of Abigail; London Tube driver
- Barry Saxon, friend of Patrick and Abigail; also a Tube driver; frequently got drunk with the two of them and heard a lot of things they had to say about Abigail's past in the church
- Alex Graves, church member who hanged himself after being abducted from the street, collecting for the UHC, by his family leading the church to canonise him as the "Stolen Prophet". He willed his money to Daiyu because he believed himself to be her father, though Papa J claimed that status himself
- Dr. Zhou, doctor for the UHC, who also has a clinic outside the church that engages in various alternative treatments
- Noli Seymour, actress who is a member of the UHC
- Giles Harmon, novelist who is a member of the UHC
- Ralph Doherty, former church member who left
- Deirdre Doherty, wife of Ralph, gave birth to Lin while in UHC and living on farm, stayed longer than Ralph but was expelled later; claimed to be raped by Jonathan Wace
- Lin Doherty, daughter of Deirdre, stayed on farm, and later had relations with Will Edensor resulting in a child, Qing (later renamed Sally).
- Niamh Doherty, daughter of Ralph and Deirdre, was in the church from ages eight to eleven
- Sheila Kennett, who lived at the UHC's farm in its early days
- Kurt Jordan Reaney, ex-UHC-member who is now in prison
- Henry Worthington-Fields, who attended a UHC retreat at age 18 but left after a week; brought Flora Brewster with him and she stayed; acquaintance of Charlotte Campbell Ross
- Flora Brewster, a former church member who had mental problems after she left the church and is a client of Prudence
- Jacob Messenger, reality show contestant who went to prison for driving while on drugs and causing injury, then was briefly involved in the UHC after leaving prison; declined offer to attend retreat at farm
- Lucas Messenger, Jacob's brother, not in the church
- Shawna, church member living on the farm who Robin gets to know; very talkative, but not so smart
- Leonard and Shelley Heaton, couple who were witnesses at the inquest regarding Daiyu's drowning because they were near the beach at the time
- Belinda "Bijou" Watkins, an attorney with whom Strike had a brief sexual relationship, dragging him into a scandal caused by her affair with a prominent married attorney
- Tasha Mayo, actress who is a client of the agency suffering from a pair of stalkers. Strike later suspects her of being romantically involved with Midge

== Reception ==
The Running Grave sold 50,925 copies in its first week on sale in the UK, placing it first on the UK Official Top 50 book sales list.

Jake Kerridge from The Daily Telegraph rated the book 3 out of 5 stars saying it is "some of her most gripping writing yet" but "did it have to be so long?" Laura Wilson, writing in The Guardian, wrote that it could have had some "judicious trimming" but was still "an immersive and, for the most part, riveting read."

== Adaptation ==
The book has been adapted as the seventh series of the BBC One drama Strike.
