= Tom Burke (actor) =

English actor

- Burke in 2026
- Born: 30 June 1981 (age 45); London, England
- Education: Royal Academy of Dramatic Art
- Occupation: Actor
- Years active: 1999–present
- Parents: David Burke (father); Anna Calder-Marshall (mother)
- Relatives: Arthur Calder-Marshall (grandfather)

Tom Burke (born 30 June 1981) is an English actor. He played Athos in the 2014–2016 BBC TV series The Musketeers, Dolokhov in the 2016 BBC literary-adaptation miniseries War & Peace, Cormoran Strike in the BBC series Strike, Orson Welles in the 2020 film Mank, and Praetorian Jack in the 2024 film Furiosa: A Mad Max Saga.

== Early life and education ==
Tom Burke was born in London and grew up in Kent. His parents, David Burke and Anna Calder-Marshall, are also actors, as were his godparents, Alan Rickman and Bridget Turner. His maternal grandparents were writers Arthur Calder-Marshall and Ara Calder-Marshall. Burke was born with a cleft lip and had reconstructive surgery.

Burke always wanted to become an actor. He attended the National Youth Theatre, the Young Arden Theatre in Faversham, and the Box Clever Theatre Company performing at the Marlowe Theatre in Canterbury, and participated in the plays his parents staged in their home town.

As a child, Burke was diagnosed with dyslexia and struggled academically. He left school before his A-levels, aged 17. He wrote to an acting agency and got the first role he auditioned for. He attended dance school before being accepted at the Royal Academy of Dramatic Art (RADA) in London when he was 18.

== Career ==
Burke's first role was as Roland in 1999's Dragonheart: A New Beginning, a direct-to-video sequel of the 1996 film Dragonheart. That year he appeared in an episode of the series Dangerfield and the television film All the King's Men.

=== Television ===
His first television part after drama school was Syd in the Paul Abbott thriller series State of Play, starring John Simm, Bill Nighy and James McAvoy. In 2004, he played Lee in the television film Bella and the Boys. In 2005, he played the 20-year-old version of Giacomo Casanova's son, Giac, in the television adaptation of Casanova, starring David Tennant and Peter O'Toole.

In 2006, he played Dr. John Seward in the television film Dracula. In 2007, he played Napoleon Bonaparte in an episode of the BBC's docudrama Heroes and Villains and had a small part as a book publisher in the satirical drama The Trial of Tony Blair. In 2009, he played Lieutenant Race in an episode of the 12th series of Agatha Christie's Poirot.

In 2011, he played Bentley Drummle in two episodes of the BBC's adaptation of Charles Dickens' Great Expectations. In 2012, he became a regular cast member in the second series of BBC Two's The Hour as journalist Bill Kendall. From 2014 to 2016, he played Athos on the BBC One series The Musketeers, an adaptation of Alexandre Dumas' The Three Musketeers. He also plays Cormoran Strike in the BBC miniseries Strike, based on the detective novels of Robert Galbraith, and Rebrov in Sky TV's The Lazarus Project, which will air in the U.S. on the TNT cable network. He played Father Derek 'Dazzle' Jennings, Princess Margaret's friend, in The Crown.

In March 2025, it was announced that Burke had joined the cast of Legends, a Netflix drama series inspired by the true story of British Customs employees sent undercover to infiltrate drug gangs.

=== Film ===
In 2004, Burke had his first cinema part in The Libertine. In 2007, he played an aspiring filmmaker who ends up directing a porn film in the comedy I Want Candy. In 2008, he played Bluey in Donkey Punch, a horror thriller that debuted at the 2008 Sundance Film Festival. In 2009, he played Geoff Goddard in Telstar: The Joe Meek Story, and had a small part in Stephen Frears' Chéri. In 2010, he played Davy in Third Star, a drama starring Benedict Cumberbatch, JJ Feild and Adam Robertson, which follows a trip four friends, one of them terminally ill, make to Barafundle Bay in Wales.

In 2012, he played Mark in Cleanskin. In 2013, he played Billy, the older brother of Ryan Gosling's character in Only God Forgives, directed by Nicolas Winding Refn. That year he had a supporting role in the Ralph Fiennes–directed film The Invisible Woman.

In 2020, he played American filmmaker Orson Welles in David Fincher's Netflix original film Mank, opposite Gary Oldman as Herman J. Mankiewicz. He also starred in English director and photographer Mitch Jenkins's 2020 film The Show (written by Alan Moore) as private investigator Fletcher Dennis. In November 2021, Burke joined Anya Taylor-Joy and Chris Hemsworth in the Mad Max: Fury Road spinoff film Furiosa: A Mad Max Saga, replacing Yahya Abdul-Mateen II, who had to drop out due to scheduling conflicts.

=== Theatre ===
As a theatre actor, Burke has worked with the Royal Shakespeare Company and has appeared in plays at Shakespeare's Globe, playing Romeo in Romeo and Juliet in 2004; at the Old Vic in Noël Coward's Design for Living opposite Andrew Scott and Lisa Dillon in 2010; and at the Almeida Theatre playing Greg in reasons to be pretty in 2011. In 2002, he played Hamlet in Howard Barker's Gertrude – The Cry, a reworking of Shakespeare's Hamlet which focuses on the character of Gertrude, the protagonist's mother.

In 2006, he worked with Ian McKellen in the play The Cut. In 2008, he played Adolph in Creditors at the Donmar Warehouse. Actor Alan Rickman, Burke's godfather, staged the play, which earned Burke an Ian Charleson Award. The play subsequently premiered at the Brooklyn Academy of Music in New York in 2010. In 2012, he played Louis Dubedat in The Doctor's Dilemma at the National Theatre.

== Acting credits ==
=== Film ===
Key
†	Denotes films that have not yet been released

Year	Film	Role	Notes
2000	Dragonheart: A New Beginning	Roland	Direct-to-video
2003	The Burl	Connor	Short film
2004	Squaddie	Andy	Short film
2005	The Libertine	Vaughan	
2006	The Enlightenment	Daniel Clay	Short film
2007	Supermarket Sam	Sam	Short film
2007	Anastezsi	Mario	
2007	I Want Candy	John 'Baggy' Bagley	
2007	The Collectors	Edgar	Short film
2008	Donkey Punch	Bluey	
2008	Telstar: The Joe Meek Story	Geoff Goddard	
2009	Chéri	Vicomte Desmond	
2009	Death in Charge	Uncle Sean	Short film
2009	Roar	Mick	Short film
2010	The Kid	Mr. Hayes	
2010	Third Star	Davy	
2010	Look, Stranger		
2011	The Sweethearts	Janek	Short film
2012	An Enemy to Die For	Terrence	
2012	Cleanskin	Mark	
2013	One Wrong Word	Norbert	Short film
2013	Only God Forgives	Billy	
2013	The Invisible Woman	Mr. George Wharton Robinson	
2013	The Brunchers	Him	Short film
2014	The Hooligan Factory	Bullet	
2019	The Souvenir	Anthony	
2020	The Show	Fletcher Dennis	
2020	Mank	Orson Welles	
2020	Blood Sugar	Liam	Short film
2021	The Souvenir Part II	Anthony	
2021	True Things	Blond	
2022	Living	Sutherland	
2022	The Wonder	William Byrne	
2022	Klokkenluider	Chris (a.k.a. Kevin)	
2024	Furiosa: A Mad Max Saga	Praetorian Jack	
2025	Black Bag	Freddie Smalls	
2025	Winter of the Crow	Ambassador	
2026	Werwulf †	Devil's Voice	Role shared with Emma Corrin; Awaiting release
2028	Elden Ring †	TBA	Post-production

=== Television ===
Year	Title	Role	Notes
1999	Dangerfield	Gavin Kirkdale	Episode: "Something Personal"
1999	All the King's Men	Private Chad Batterbee	TV movie
2003	State of Play	Syd	Limited-run series, recurring role
2003	The Young Visiters	Horace	TV movie
2003	P.O.W.	Robbie Crane	1 episode
2004	Bella and the Boys	Lee	TV movie
2004	The Inspector Lynley Mysteries	Julian Britton	Episode: "In Pursuit of the Proper Sinner"
2005	Casanova	Giac Casanova, aged 20	Miniseries, title role, 1 episode
2005	The Brief	Dan Ottway	Episode: "Lack of Affect"
2005	Jericho	Edward Wellesley	Miniseries, episode: "A Pair of Ragged Claws"
2005	All About George	Paul	Recurring role
2006	Dracula	Dr. John Seward	TV movie
2006	Number 13	Edward Jenkins	Television short
2007	The Trial of Tony Blair	Book Publisher	TV movie
2007	Heroes and Villains	Napoleon Bonaparte	Episode: "Napoleon"
2008	In Love with Barbara	Ronald Cartland	TV movie
2009	Agatha Christie's Poirot	Lieutenant Colin Race	Episode: "The Clocks"
2011	Great Expectations	Bentley Drummle	Miniseries, main cast
2012	The Hour	Bill Kendall	Main cast (series 2)
2013	Heading Out	Ben	1 episode
2014	Utopia	Philip Carvel	1 episode
2014–2016	The Musketeers	Athos	Main cast
2016	War & Peace	Fedya Dolokhov	Miniseries, main cast
2017–present	Strike	Cormoran Strike	Title role
2019	Responsible Child	William Ramsden	TV movie
2020	The Crown	Derek 'Dazzle' Jennings	Episode: "The Hereditary Principle"
2021	Modern Love	Michael	Episode: "On a Serpentine Road, With the Top Down"
2022–2023	The Lazarus Project	Denis Rebrov	Main cast
2026	Legends	Guy	Main cast
2026	California Avenue	Cooper	Miniseries, main cast; premiered at 2026 Canneseries
2026	Blade Runner 2099 †		Miniseries, recurring role, post-production

=== Theatre ===
Year	Title	Role	Location	Notes	Ref.
2002	Gertrude – The Cry	Hamlet	Riverside Studios		
2003	The Wax King (Henry VI, Part 3)	Lord Clifford	The Dreaming Will Initiative	part of the documentary film How Do You Know My Daughter?	
2003	Fragile Land	Fidel	Hampstead Theatre		
2003	The Monument	Stetko	Finborough Theatre		
2004	Romeo and Juliet	Romeo	Shakespeare's Globe		
2005	Macbeth	Malcolm	Almeida Theatre		
2005	The Incarcerator	Liddle	Old Red Lion Theatre		
2006	The Cut	Stephen	Donmar Warehouse		
2007	Scenes from an Execution	Carpeta	Hackney Empire		
2007	Glass Eels	Kenneth	Hampstead Theatre		
2007	Don Juan Comes Back From the War	Don Juan	Belgrade Theatre		
2008	I'll Be The Devil	Dermot	Tricycle Theatre		
2008	Excerpt from The Poisoned Atmosphere		Soho Studio	Director	
2008	Creditors	Adolph	Donmar Warehouse		
2009	Restoration	Robert Merivel	Salisbury Playhouse		
2010	Design for Living	Otto	The Old Vic		
2011	reasons to be pretty	Greg	Almeida Theatre		
2012	The Doctor's Dilemma	Louis Dubedat	National Theatre		
2016	Reasons to be Happy	Greg	Hampstead Theatre		
2016	The Deep Blue Sea	Freddie Page	National Theatre		
2018	Don Carlos	Posa / The Grand Inquisitor	Northcott Theatre		
2019	Rosmersholm	Johannes Rosmer	Duke of York's Theatre		
2025	The Seagull	Trigorin	Barbican Theatre		

== Awards and nominations ==
Year	Award	Work	Result	Ref.
2008	Ian Charleson Award	Creditors at Donmar Warehouse	Won	
2019	British Independent Film Award for Best Actor	The Souvenir	Nominated	
2022	British Independent Film Awards for Best Ensemble	The Wonder	Nominated	
2023	London Critics Circle Award for Best Supporting Actor	The Wonder	Nominated	
