= Sphere Books =

British publishing company

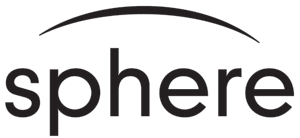
- Parent company: Little, Brown/Hachette
- Founded: 1966; 60 years ago
- Country of origin: United Kingdom
- Headquarters location: London
- Publication types: Paperbacks, hardbacks
- Nonfiction topics: Biography, autobiography
- Fiction genres: Science fiction, fantasy, occult
- Official website: littlebrown.co.uk/imprint/sphere/page/lbbg-imprint-sphere/

Sphere Books is the name of two British paperback publishers.

== History ==
The original Sphere Books was launched in 1966 by Thomson Corporation. Sphere was sold to Pearson PLC in 1985 and became part of Penguin. Macdonald & Co. (Publishers) bought Sphere Books, including the Abacus and Cardinal imprints, in April 1989. Sphere's science fiction and fantasy titles were absorbed into the Orbit list (bar Marion Zimmer Bradley's books, which were retained by the Penguin Group), and Sphere's general fiction and non-fiction titles were absorbed into Futura Publications' general list. The name was retired in 1990.

For a few Calvin and Hobbes compilation books, in the UK, Sphere published them.

In 1976, Sphere paid $225,000 for the British publishing rights from Ballantine Books for the novelisation of a forthcoming science fiction film, Star Wars: From the Adventures of Luke Skywalker by George Lucas (ghostwritten by Alan Dean Foster). The book, like the film Star Wars released the following year, was an enormous success and sold out its initial print run. Sphere also published the UK editions of Conan fantasy series by Robert E. Howard. The occult writer Dennis Wheatley edited a series of books published under the umbrella title of The Dennis Wheatley Library of the Occult, which included titles such as Dracula by Bram Stoker, Moonchild by Aleister Crowley, Frankenstein by Mary Shelley and Faust by Johann Wolfgang von Goethe. Sphere's involvement in science fiction was furthered with its Sphere Science Fiction Classics series published throughout the 1970s, which included The World of Null-A and The Pawns of Null-A by A. E. van Vogt, Arthur C. Clarke's The Sands of Mars and Larry Niven's Neutron Star.

In 2006, Hachette Book Group acquired a number of imprints from the Time Warner Book Group, including Little, Brown and Company, Hodder & Stoughton Virago Press and Sphere. Today's Sphere is an imprint of Little, Brown. Writers whose works have been published with Sphere have included Patricia Cornwell, Mark Billingham, Jenny Colgan, Mitch Albom, Nicholas Sparks and Nicholas Evans. Sphere best-sellers have included Long Way Round by Ewan McGregor and Charley Boorman, Ricky Tomlinson's autobiography Ricky, Sharon Osbourne's autobiography Extreme, A Brother's Journey by Richard B. Pelzer, Scar Tissue by Anthony Kiedis and Is It Just Me or Is Everything Shit? by Steve Lowe and Alan McArthur.
