= Zak Knutson =

American film director (born 1974)

Zak Charles Knutson
- Born: January 4, 1974 (age 52); Detroit, Michigan, U.S.
- Occupations: American actor and film producer
- Years active: 1993–present
- Spouse: Molly Glover (2010-present)

Zak Knutson (born January 4, 1974, in Detroit, Michigan) is a director, producer, writer, and actor.

== Career ==
=== 1990s ===
Starting in 1993, Knutson acted in multiple television programs including The Fresh Prince of Bel-Air, Coach, Beverly Hills, 90210, and The John Larroquette Show.

=== 2000s ===
In 2000, Knutson landed an assistant role at View Askew Productions. In 2005, he created the production company Chop Shop Entertainment with longtime friend Joey Figueroa.

=== 2010s ===
The last Chop Shop project was Milius, a documentary on Hollywood rebel John Milius. The film opened at the SXSW Film Festival in 2013. The film also played at the Telluride Film Festival and the BFI London Film Festival. In 2014, Knutson directed Marvel 75: From Pulp to Pop for Marvel and ABC Television. Knutson directed Shock the World, a documentary about Jesse Ventura's path from professional wrestler to governor of Minnesota. Shock the World premiered April 2015 at the Tribeca/ESPN Sports Film Festival.

Knutson directed Marvel's Captain America: 75 Heroic Years, which aired on ABC on January 19, 2016.

The film Supercon, starring Clancy Brown, Maggie Grace and John Malkovich, was written by Knutson (along with Dana Snyder and Andy Sipes) and is directed by Knutson.

== Personal life ==
In his youth, Knutson was an avid surfer and a fan of the film Big Wednesday. Knutson worked as a bouncer in the mid 1990s and as a tour guide for Universal Studios Hollywood.

== Filmography ==
Year	Film	Director	Producer	Editor	Actor	Notes
1993	The John Larroquette Show				Yes	Episode "There's a Mister Hitler Here to See You" as Hanz
1994	Fresh Prince of Bel-Air				Yes	Episode "I Know Why the Caged Bird Screams" as Football Player #2
1994	Star Trek: Deep Space Nine				Yes	Episode "Civil Defense" as Pakled Commander
1994	Coach				Yes	Episodes "The Popcorn Bowl" and "Out of Control" as Doug Prescott
1995	Sisters				Yes	Episode "Sleeping with the Devil" as Drunk Frat Guy
1995	Burke's Law				Yes	Episode "Who Killed Cock-a-Doodle Dooley?" as Detective Dan Cutter
1995	Species				Yes	As Club Doorman (uncredited)
2001	FreakyLinks				Yes	Episode "Subject: Still I Rise" as Production Assistant
2001	Jay and Silent Bob Strike Back				Yes	(voice) (uncredited) as The C.L.I.T.
2004	Snowball Effect: The Story of 'Clerks'					Line producer
2004	Clerks 10th Anniversary Q & A		Yes			Producer
2004	Clerks: The Lost Scene				Yes	(voice) as Mr. Dwyer
2005	Laws of Gambling		Yes		Yes	As Bartender
2005	The Ape		Yes			Also Line producer
2006	Clerks II				Yes	As the Sexy Stud
2006	Train Wreck!	Yes	Yes	Yes		
2006	Back to the Well: the making of Clerks II	Yes	Yes	Yes		
2007	The Art of Travel: Production Webisodes	Yes	Yes	Yes		
2007	Good Time Max		Yes		Yes	(co-producer); As Carl
2008	Sold Out: A Threevening with Kevin Smith	Yes	Yes	Yes		co-produced; co-directed
2009	Fanboys				Yes	As Bob the Trucker
2009	Popcorn Porn - Watching Zack and Miri Make a Porno	Yes	Yes	Yes		
2011	Kevin Smith: Too Fat for 40	Yes	Yes	Yes		
2011	Tracing Amy - The Chasing Amy Doc	Yes	Yes	Yes		
2011	Hollywoo				Yes	As Paramount Head of Security
2012	Kevin Smith: Burn in Hell	Yes	Yes	Yes		
2012	Get the Gringo				Yes	As Hitman 2
2012	Spoilers With Kevin Smith	Yes	Yes			Producer: Episode #1.10 You Don't Know Dick: 'K. Phillip'; Stiller? I Never Met Her; Aurora's Dark Knight; Peter Parker Pecked a Pack of Powers; I Don't Wanna Miss a Thong; Gore Score and Severed Ears Ago; Cruising to the Oldies; Ridley Me This, Fatman; Girls Just Wanna Have Guns Director: Episode #1.10; You Don't Know Dick: 'K. Phillip'; Stiller? I Never Met Her; Aurora's Dark Knight; Peter Parker Pecked a Pack of Powers; I Don't Wanna Miss a Thong; Gore Score and Severed Ears Ago; Cruising to the Oldies; Ridley Me This, Fatman; Girls Just Wanna Have Guns
2013	Milius	Yes	Yes	Yes		
2014	Tusk				Yes	As Ernest Hemingway
2014	Marvel 75: From Pulp to Pop	Yes				
2015	Shock the World	Yes				
2016	Marvel's Captain America: 75 Heroic Years	Yes				
2018	Supercon	Yes				Also writing credit

== Awards and nominations ==
Year	Award	Category	Nominated work	Result
2013	SXSW Film Festival	Audience Award	Milius	Nominated
2013	Sitges - Catalan International Film Festival	New Visions Award	Milius	Won
