= Code Monkeys =

American adult animated sitcom

- Code Monkeys title card; main characters from left to right: Black Steve, Dave, Todd, Clare, Jerry, Mary, Mr. Larrity, Dean and Benny.
- Genre: Animated sitcom
- Created by: Adam de la Peña
- Voices of: Adam de la Peña; Matt Mariska; Andy Sipes; Dana Snyder; Tony Strickland; Gretchen McNeil; Suzanne Keilly; Lionel Tubbins
- Opening theme: "Code Monkey" by Jonathan Coulton
- Composer: Jon and Al Kaplan
- Country of origin: United States
- Original language: English
- No. of seasons: 2
- No. of episodes: 26

Production
- Executive producer: Adam de la Peña
- Producers: Jennifer Saxon Gore; Tony Strickland
- Running time: Approx. 22 minutes
- Production companies: Monkey Wrangler Productions; G4 Media, LLC

Original release
- Network: G4
- Release: July 11, 2007 – August 17, 2008

Code Monkeys is an American adult animated sitcom by Adam de la Peña. Set in the early 1980s, it follows the adventures of fictional video game company GameaVision. The show ran for two seasons, from 2007 to 2008, on G4.

== Plot ==
The plot of Code Monkeys revolves around the fictitious video game company GameaVision (a play on companies like Activision and Intellivision) and its eccentric employees, mainly the slacker Dave and his high-strung friend Jerry. The entire series takes place in the Silicon Valley city of Sunnyvale, California during the 1980s. Code Monkeys relies on crude humor and stoner comedy to convey the numerous references to video games, past and present, but mostly games from the 8-bit era. This also extends to cameos from well known video game developers, who appear in the show pitching their ideas to GameaVision for the games that would later make them famous, usually to be rejected, insulted, and sometimes injured or killed off.

== Episode structure ==
A screenshot from "Code Monkeys", showcasing elements of the show: the health meter (upper-right), score (upper-left) and text box (bottom).

Code Monkeys is presented as though it were an 8-bit video game. In keeping with this format, characters, backgrounds and other objects are rendered with an 8-bit color palette, occasionally leading to trouble animating specific objects. Most episodes begin with a screen flashing "PLAYER 1 START!"; episodes end with a black "Game Over" screen, with a "kill screen" appearing after the production company logo in the first season. Before each commercial break, a small pause box typically appears in the middle of the screen which freezes the scene. On the two occasions when Jerry "dies", a "Game Over/Continue?" box appears, with the "player" contemplating selecting "No", but then choosing "Yes" to continue the episode. Near the end of "Todd Loses His Mind", the episode "crashes" abruptly, forcing the "player" to eject the "game cartridge" to blow dust off its connectors, and the episode is reset to its beginning, thus negating everything that happened in the episode. The show also features status bars at the top and bottom of the frame, which display a running counter of points earned by the characters doing video game-like actions in each episode, a health meter for the current characters, narrative asides based on certain characters' actions or dialogue, and other humorous sayings or pictures based on an episode's story line. Characters also use similar methods to show emotions, such as air humping (usually to exaggerate sexuality or awesomeness), or throwing up the sign of the horns. The show is entirely computer-animated, with the exception of the "game crash" scene in "Todd Loses His Mind", and is done in-house at the G4 studios in Los Angeles. The original music for the show, video game-styled underscore, is composed by Jon and Al Kaplan. Other music prominently featured in the series includes music by Los Angeles heavy metal group Tinhorn. Jonathan Coulton's song "Code Monkey" serves as the theme song of the show.

== Characters ==
- Dave (voiced by Adam de la Peña) — Dave is the lead character of the show and the de facto lead programmer at GameaVision. A constant slacker, he focuses his attention more on playing games than actually making them. Dave is also a frequent cannabis user; he claims that most of his game ideas were conceived while he was high. Dave often grosses out his co-workers by either throwing up in front of them, having his pants down at inopportune moments, humping random people or objects, or performing other lewd acts. A rampant hedonist, Dave seems to be only ever motivated by money, drugs, and sex. Most of the characters' predicaments are caused by Dave's erratic and impulsive actions. While he considers him to be his best friend, Dave often insults Jerry and manipulates his emotions. Despite his quirks, Dave has a flair to all of his actions and is a competent game programmer.
- Jerry (voiced by Matt Mariska) — Jerry is the show's other main character and Dave's best friend, fellow programmer, and office-mate. Unlike Dave, Jerry is hard-working, responsible, and tidy. Usually under Dave's negative influence, however, Jerry will succumb to sinful pleasures, often with disastrous outcomes. Jerry's running gags throughout the series deal with his unrequited crush on fellow programmer Mary (who constantly rejects him), fixing the damage Dave causes, wetting himself when nervous or threatened, and his insecurities and weak will.
- Bob "Big" T. Larrity (voiced by Andy Sipes) — Mr. Larrity is the current head of GameaVision. He is a Texan billionaire who, even though he knows nothing about video games (only that they're sure to make him lots of money), bought the company from Steve Wozniak Larrity often employs various illegal methods to make his fortune. In addition to being ignorant, Larrity is violent, manic, bigoted, and misogynistic. Despite his apparent stupidity, Larrity can be quite cunning and manipulative. He treats his employees with no respect, but still cares about them to a degree, particularly for Dave, Jerry, and Benny, whom he sees as his surrogate sons. Larrity and Black Steve also share a begrudging respect for each other over their shooting prowess.
- Dean Larrity (voiced by Andy Sipes) — Dean is Mr. Larrity's extremely muscular son. He is appointed by his father as GameaVision's Head Supervisor. Dean has limited interaction with the other employees, never participates in any of the programming, and (aside from helping his dad cover up his illegal activities) doesn't even seem to do any actual work. He often uses violence to solve problems.
- Todd (voiced by Dana Snyder) — Todd is GameaVision's resident fantasy game designer, a fat 33-year-old geek who is always seen wearing a horned helmet. Todd's narcissism, use of pretentious language, and eccentricity, often blurring the lines between his Dungeons & Dragons-inspired fantasy and reality, make him the most despised employee at the company; other characters often refer to him as "creepy" and "douche". Todd also lives with his mother, with whom he has a near-incestuous relationship.
- Black Steve (voiced by Tony Strickland) — Black Steve is GameaVision's accountant and, as his nickname would imply, he is the only black person working at the company. He is foul-mouthed, ill-tempered, and racist against white people. Despite his position, Black Steve has contributed games to the company, mostly themed to his prejudice towards white people. He is apparently fluent in Japanese and conversational Arabic. He is also a former pro wrestler known as "The Black Shadow" as well as a graduate of Dartmouth College. Though bigoted towards whites, Black Steve does coexist with his co-workers and even has garnered Larrity's respect due to his violent temper and love of guns.
- Mary (voiced by Gretchen McNeil) — Mary is GameaVision's sole female programmer, and is never taken seriously by any of the other sexist employees, except for Jerry, who has a major crush on her but is rebuffed due to his friendship with Dave and overall spinelessness. Compared to her boss and co-workers, Mary is considered to be the most level-headed employee at GameaVision. Because of her strong beliefs in feminism, she is often accused of being a lesbian; a majority of the games she designs are targeted at girls or revolve around women's issues in some way.
- Clare (voiced by Suzanne Keilly) — Clare is GameaVision's receptionist. The antithesis to Mary, Clare is airheaded, self-centered, self-conscious, and sexually promiscuous, even going as far as partaking in BDSM-related activities. Like Mary, however, Clare is often treated with little, if any, respect by her co-workers.
- Benny (voiced by Dana Snyder) — Benny is a Korean child, illegally adopted by Larrity to test the company's games. He is fed a diet of cigarettes, Pixy Stix, bags of pure sugar, and amphetamines to stunt his growth and keep him game-testing nonstop. As a result, Benny is constantly hyper and usually spends his time roaming through the building's ventilation and plumbing systems, making a side living selling things to employees. No games can be shipped without Benny's approval, which causes the programmers, namely Dave and Jerry, to repeatedly bribe him with (often illegal) treats and toys. He is often accompanied by a taciturn, muscular bodyguard. Benny is also an accomplished martial artist and has taken down men who are twice his size.
- Clarence (voiced by Lionel Tubbins) — Clarence is GameaVision's audio designer. Flamboyantly gay, he wears sparkly jumpsuits, sings effectively all of his dialogue, and constantly makes blatant references to gay sex. He has also demonstrated the abilities to levitate and pass through walls, using "gay magic" which can be toggled on and off, possibly a play on the "fairy" pejorative of homosexuality. Occasionally, Clarence pitches homosexually-themed games to the company.

== History ==
While working on the pilot of Minoriteam for Cartoon Network and Adult Swim, Adam de la Peña began writing a script for what would become Code Monkeys. The original title for the show was Dave And Jerry VS The World, but the name was changed to Code Monkeys after receiving the rights to use the Jonathan Coulton song of the same name. After making a seven-minute animation test, he began shopping for a network to broadcast the show. He settled with G4 because he thought they understood the premise of the show the most. G4 allowed him to make a full-length pilot and subsequently picked up the show for 13 episodes and after a successful first season ratings-wise, the show was picked up for a second season.

Several months before Code Monkeys began airing, G4 launched an advertising campaign for the show in which GameaVision was presented as a real game company. There were two commercial advertisements for the fictitious games "Crosswalk" and "Barfight", the games "Sir Eats-A-Lot" and "Floating Space Rocks" were featured in a "Cheat! G-Spot" segment, and "Barfight" was featured in an episode of Attack of the Show. G4 created a website for GameaVision's, featuring two playable games: "2 Card Monte", which cannot be won; and "Hangman", which contains fewer than 10 words, all of which are meant to insult the player. These playable games can be found on both discs of the Code Monkeys DVD, both having a separate Flash game link, including each their own individual SWF files.

On February 27, 2017, Adam De La Pena tweeted "And then there's this....gameavision.com", hinting at the show's return. As of 2021, the same year that G4 relaunched, nothing has come to materialize.

== Episodes ==
=== Season 1 (2007) ===
No.	Title	Directed by	Written by	Original release date
1	"The Woz"	Adam de la Peña	Adam de la Peña	July 11, 2007
When their boss, Steve Wozniak, decides to quit GameAVision in order to cash in on investing in home computers, video game programmers Dave and Jerry try to scare off potential buyers and talk Wozniak out of quitting. But things get sticky when Big T. Larrity, a brash, gun-crazy oil tycoon, and his meathead jock son, Dean, show an interest in the company and the other workers decide to quit and join their soulless rival, BellecoVision. Guest star: Steve Wozniak as himself
2	"E.T."	Adam de la Peña	Adam de la Peña	July 18, 2007
Film director Steven Spielberg calls upon GameAVision to create a video game adaptation of his latest movie, E.T.: The Extraterrestrial. Guest star: Edmond Eggleston as Steven Spielberg, Cam Clarke as Neil Diamond, Seán Cullen as George Lucas
3	"Stonervision"	Adam de la Peña	Adam de la Peña	July 25, 2007
Dave convinces Jerry to quit GameAVision so they can create and sell their own video games, but Dave blows money he borrowed from a drug lord on a fully-furnished mansion. Meanwhile, Larrity hires replacements for Dave and Jerry that turn out to be undercover cops. Guest star: Nolan Bushnell as himself
4	"Super Prison Breakout"	Adam de la Peña	Adam de la Peña	August 1, 2007
After discovering one of his bags of money has gone missing, Larrity punishes the entire staff of GameAVision by taking them on a Scared Straight-style trip to prison. Guest star: Matt Hullum as Red Guard, Burnie Burns as Blue Guard, Joel Heyman as Head Guard, Joe Kelly as Cereal Killer
5	"Just One of the Gamers"	Adam de la Peña	Adam de la Peña	August 8, 2007
Sick of not being taken seriously in a male-dominated work environment, Mary (one of the few female programmers at GameAVision) decides to dress as a man and pose as her alleged brother. Guest star: David Jaffe as himself
6	"The Takeover"	Adam de la Peña	Adam de la Peña	August 15, 2007
Larrity invites the head honchos of Japanese video game company, Protendo, to GameAVision as part of an upcoming merger. Guest star: Taishi Mizuno as Matsui
7	"Larrity's Got Back"	Adam de la Peña	Adam de la Peña	August 22, 2007
Larrity is diagnosed with butthole cancer and gets a butt transplant from a young, black woman who died at a 2 Live Crew concert. Meanwhile, Todd deals with an underage mail-order bride from Vietnam who gives erotic massages out to all the men at GameAVision.
8	"IPO"	Adam de la Peña	Adam de la Peña	August 29, 2007
GameAVision's staff get an IPO (at the cost of 25% of their salaries), which doesn't sit well with them...until Black Steve tells them that they can borrow against the stock, be millionaires, and never have to work again.
9	"Todd Loses His Mind"	Adam de la Peña	Adam de la Peña	September 5, 2007
While Dave and Jerry deal with Benny (the Korean boy Larrity adopted to work as a video game tester) and his outrageous demands in order to get their games approved, Todd has a mental breakdown after his latest fantasy game gets rejected and he gets shot while trying to ram his van into GameAVision headquarters. Guest star: Gary Gygax as himself
10	"Third Reich's the Charm"	Adam de la Peña	Adam de la Peña	September 12, 2007
Dave bets Mary that he can convince Larrity to greenlight the most horrible and financially-devastating game possible. When he successfully pitches a game starring Adolf Hitler, he attracts the attention of the former dictator's estate. Guest star: Lorne Lanning as himself
11	"Wrassle Mania"	Adam de la Peña	Adam de la Peña	September 19, 2007
Larrity hires professional wrestlers as ringers for an upcoming match against BellecoVision Guest star: John Romero as Himself, Drew Pinsky as Referee
12	"Vegas, Baby!"	Adam de la Peña	Adam de la Peña	September 26, 2007
The GameAVision staff are going to the Annual Video Game Convention in Las Vegas, where Dave forces Jerry to leave the booth in order to score old fireworks in the desert, Mary and Clare discover a male strip club, Black Steve teaches Clarence how to fire a gun, Todd meets a robot girl at a sci-fi convention, only to discover that she's a hooker with an angry pimp; and Larrity plays poker and loses the company to Gil Bates, a computer nerd looking to start his own software company.
13	"The Revenge of Matsui"	Adam de la Peña	Adam de la Peña	October 3, 2007
Following the events from "The Takeover", Protendo's ninjas kidnap Benny and it's up to GameAVision (and a reluctant Harrison Ford) to rescue him.

=== Season 2 (2008) ===
No.	Title	Directed by	Written by	Original release date
14	"The Story of 420"	Adam de la Peña	Adam de la Peña	April 20, 2008
The GameAVision crew go on a Goonies-style quest to find a hippie who went missing after trying to create the world's most perfect marijuana. Meanwhile, Nancy Reagan comes after the company for their immoral games. Guest star: Tommy Chong as Laird Boony
15	"Psychological Problems"	Adam de la Peña	Adam de la Peña	June 1, 2008
In order to keep their insurance, the GameAVision staff must be psychoanalyzed, but it's the psychiatrist who ends up going crazy when she meets them.
16	"My Pal Jodie"	Adam de la Peña	Adam de la Peña	June 8, 2008
GameAVision may be facing serious consequences when Dave's latest game is implicated as the motivation behind a deranged man's attempt at assassinating Ronald Reagan.
17	"Dave Gets Boobs"	Adam de la Peña	Adam de la Peña	June 15, 2008
Sick of blowing his money on strippers, Dave decides to get breast implants, and gets all the wanted and unwanted attention that comes with it. Meanwhile, Todd does what he can to get more attention at the office than Dave. Guest star: Rachel Ramras as Dolly Patron
18	"Valley of the Silicon Dolls"	Adam de la Peña	Adam de la Peña	June 22, 2008
GameAVision faces competition against the Lettuce Patch Kids company. Guest star: Scott Campbell as himself
19	"The Kid is Mine"	Adam de la Peña	Adam de la Peña	June 29, 2008
Dave helps Michael Jackson create a video game based on his Thriller album.
20	"Dean in Charge"	Adam de la Peña	Adam de la Peña	July 6, 2008
After accidentally getting shot in the face, Larrity temporarily leaves GameAVision in the hands of his idiot son, Dean, who turns it into a frathouse. Guest star: Howard Scott Warshaw as himself
21	"Drunken Office Party"	Adam de la Peña	Adam de la Peña	July 13, 2008
Jerry freaks out when he wakes up in bed next to Clare (the emotionally needy receptionist/secretary) and things get worse when he finds out he broke Dave's arm and offended everyone while drunk at GameAVision's office party. Meanwhile, Todd's new girlfriend turns out to be KITT from Night Rider.
22	"Trouble in the Middle East"	Adam de la Peña	Adam de la Peña	July 20, 2008
Terrorists from the Middle Eastern country of Khakistan steal a large stock of new game consoles, then kidnap Dave and Todd (believing he's Jerry) to develop games for them. Meanwhile, Larrity makes Jerry his "pee charm".
23	"Benny's Birthday"	Adam de la Peña	Adam de la Peña	July 27, 2008
Larrity tries to get rid of Benny after Benny ages out of the company's demographic. Meanwhile, Todd's brother, Chris, visits GameAVision. Guest star: Chris Elliott as Chris
24	"The Great Recession"	Adam de la Peña	Adam de la Peña	August 3, 2008
Thanks to the early-to-mid 1980s video game crash, GameAVision shuts down, prompting the staff to find jobs elsewhere and Larrity to return to his novelty toys and gag company. Guest star: Ed Boon as himself, Steve Wiebe as himself, Kevin Pereira as Fast Food Manager
25	"Dave's Day Off"	Adam de la Peña	Adam de la Peña	August 10, 2008
Dave concocts a scheme to avoid work by faking illness. Meanwhile, John Hughes visits GameAVision for inspiration for an upcoming movie.
26	"Car Robber Sunnyvale"	Adam de la Peña	Adam de la Peña	August 17, 2008
Jerry is menaced by a Russian mob boss named Boris after Dave stiffs him on royalties for his voice acting talent. Meanwhile, Larrity's father appears to buy his son's company, which is discovered to be sitting on an oil deposit. Guest star: Jason Zumwalt as Boris

== Reception ==
According to the president of G4, the first season was a huge success for the network. During its first season the show was watched by more than 20 million people. Since its inception, Code Monkeys has received mixed reviews. Virginia Heffernan of The New York Times called the show a "promising idea [with] gags [told in a South Park deadpan dialect that] has a fast free-for-all quality, as if they were produced by a zealous Galaga player with his palm down flat on the "fire" button." Scott Jon Siegel of Joystiq agreed, saying that "Code Monkeys has potential, [but] squanders it." He went on to say that "there was hope that G4 could deliver something actually watchable. [Code Monkeys] isn't." Jake Swearingen of Wired magazine stated that the show would appeal to "anyone who spent their youth blowing dust out of Nintendo cartridges and developing Contra-induced carpal tunnel syndrome." Furthermore, he compared Code Monkeys to arcade games of the 1980s, stating "[m]uch like the classics it riffs on, Code quickly veers into the wildly surreal." Andy Grieser of Zap2it called the show "the funniest ... animation this side of South Park." He called the graphics "instant nostalgia for thirty-somethings." Will Harris of Bullz-Eye.com gave the show a 3.5/5 and commented that Code Monkeys is a "twisted little show", but that it's "not for all tastes."

== Streaming ==
The series is currently not available for streaming.

== Home media ==
Shout! Factory, partnering with G4, released a two-disc DVD set of the first season of Code Monkeys on August 5, 2008 in Region 1.

Code Monkeys: Season One
Set Details	Special Features
13 Episodes; 2-Disc Set; 1.33:1 aspect ratio; Subtitles: None; English (Stereo 2.0)	"Adam de la Peña Interview"; "A Look Behind the Scenes of Code Monkeys"; "Daily Pranks"; "GameaVision's 'Hangman'"; "Original Commercials"; "Gaming Tips from Kristin Holt"; "GameaVision's '2 Card Monty'"; Downloadable Wallpapers and Posters
