= Supercon (film) =

2018 film directed by Zak Knutson

- Film poster
- Directed by: Zak Knutson
- Written by: Zak Knutson; Andy Sipes; Dana Snyder
- Produced by: Susan Gorrell; Michael R. Williams; Lisa Yesko; DJ Dodd; Ken Gorrell; Mike Epps
- Starring: Ryan Kwanten; Maggie Grace; Mike Epps; Russell Peters; Clancy Brown; John Malkovich
- Cinematography: Zoran Popovic
- Edited by: Jay Wade Edwards; Dustin Chow
- Music by: James L. Venable
- Production companies: Momentum Productions; Future Proof Films
- Distributed by: Archstone Distribution; Sony Pictures Home Entertainment
- Release date: April 27, 2018
- Running time: 100 minutes
- Country: United States
- Language: English

Supercon is a 2018 American action comedy film directed by Zak Knutson, who wrote the screenplay with Andy Sipes and Dana Snyder. It stars an ensemble cast including Ryan Kwanten, Maggie Grace, Mike Epps, Russell Peters, Clancy Brown, and John Malkovich.

The film was simultaneously released in limited theaters and on VOD in the United States on April 27, 2018, before being released on DVD and Blu-ray on June 5, 2018.

== Plot ==
A group of former TV stars and comic book artists who make their living on the convention circuit decide to steal the earnings from the promoter.

== Cast ==
- Ryan Kwanten as Matt Wheeler
- Russell Peters as Keith Mahar
- Maggie Grace as Allison McNealy
- Brooks Braselman as Brock Hutchinson
- Mike Epps as Gil Burkhaulter
- Clancy Brown as Adam King
- John Malkovich as Sid Newberry
- Caroline Fourmy as Ms Lily
- Tyrus as Callahan
- Donald Elise Watkins as Robert
- Hunter Burke as Sean
- Anthony Nguyen as Rocky
- CariDee English as Tall Blonde / Fiona
- Jeff Pope as Moderator
- Russell Tyrrell as Sound Tech
- Devyn A. Tyler as Tameron
- Zachary Hashemian as Young Keith As Hadji
- Zak Knutson as Judge Glover
- Matt Shurley as Jay Edwards
- Candi Brooks as Intern Cindy
- Bobbie Blanque as Intern Lisa
- Dana Snyder as Loudmouth Jerk
- Cailey Fleming as Lizzie Fisher Fan

== Production ==
It was confirmed on July 1, 2016, that Malkovich joined the cast of the film.

The film was shot in New Orleans and Alario Center in nearby Westwego, Louisiana

== Reception ==
The film has a 23% rating on Rotten Tomatoes, based on 13 critics response with an average score of 3.9/10. Michael Ordona of Common Sense Media awarded the film two stars out of five.
