= Dallas & Robo =

- Genre: Adult animation; Comedy
- Created by: Mike Roberts
- Developed by: Matt Mariska; Mike Roberts; Andy Sipes
- Voices of: John Cena; Kat Dennings; Stephen Root; Tim Blake Nelson; Milana Vayntrub; Dana Snyder
- Composer: The Sadies
- Country of origin: United States
- Original language: English
- No. of seasons: 1
- No. of episodes: 8

Production
- Executive producers: Mike Roberts; Matt Mariska; Andy Sipes; John Cena; Alexander Bulkley; Corey Campodonico
- Producers: Meredith Rodgers; Kat Dennings
- Running time: 22–26 minutes
- Production company: ShadowMachine

Original release
- Network: YouTube Premium
- Release: May 30, 2018

Dallas & Robo is an American adult animation comedy television series created by Mike Roberts and starring John Cena and Kat Dennings that premiered on May 30, 2018, on YouTube Premium.

The series began airing on Syfy's late-night programming block TZGZ on August 8, 2020.

== Premise ==
Dallas & Robo follows "sassy space-trucker Dallas and self-proclaimed warrior-poet robot Robo who must navigate their way around cannibal bikers, rival space truckers, and vending machine burritos as they try to make a buck in the seedy world of interplanetary big-rigging."

== Cast and characters ==
=== Main ===
- John Cena as Robo
- Kat Dennings as Dallas Moonshiner
- Stephen Root as Uncle Danny Moonshiner
- Tim Blake Nelson as The Woodsman
- Milana Vayntrub as Ellie Moonshiner
- Dana Snyder as Fat Paul

=== Recurring ===
- Julie Nathanson as Computer
- Giancarlo Esposito as Victor Goldsmith
- Clancy Brown as The Stranger
- Taran Killam as Bright Eyes
- Jane Lynch as Carol
- Steve Little as Freddy Calhoun
- Bree Williamson as Hellen
- Nat Faxon as Clark

=== Guest ===
- Matt Braunger as Blood Tooth ("Aces Wild")
- Charlyne Yi as Amber ("Moonbound and Down")
- David Hornsby as Dirt Ripper ("Murder on the Georgia Overdrive"), a murderer hiding aboard the "Georgia Overdrive" that assumes the identity of the ship's intern, Skip, after killing him.
- Tom Lennon as Dr. John Eichler and Dicky St. James ("Murder on the Georgia Overdrive")
- Dale Watson as The Balladeer ("Murder on the Georgia Overdrive")
- Suzanne Keilly as Dr. Gretta Bunson ("Murder on the Georgia Overdrive")
- Ted Raimi as Bruce Stoneman and Dr. Emanuel Gardner ("Murder on the Georgia Overdrive")
- Eric Bauza as Whiskey Johnson and Bill Dickman ("Le Mars")
- Dave Dameshek as Gene Leondowski ("Le Mars")
- Jeffrey DeMunn as Charlie ("I Was a Teenage Cannibal Biker")
- Ethan Phillips as Bob ("I Was a Teenage Cannibal Biker")
- Bob Bergen as Grizzled Trucker ("I Was a Teenage Cannibal Biker")

== Episodes ==
No.	Title	Directed by	Written by	Original release date
1	"Aces Wild"	Phillip Andrews	Matt Mariska, Mike Roberts, & Andy Sipes	May 30, 2018
Former drag racer, Dallas Moonshiner, and A.I., Robo, are truckers who traverse the cosmos. After accidentally killing a couple of cannibalistic bikers, the duo are accosted by them and have their truck stolen. Their boss, Uncle Danny, informs them that they were carrying powerful weapons and that in the hands of the bikers could be dangerous. The two arrive at the bikers' hideout and meet their leader and Dallas' former drag race partner Carol who wants what is inside their cargo. Robo fights off the bikers and they retrieve the cargo, but end up destroying some of it to defeat the bikers. Back at the Mars base, a stranger, who appeared throughout the episode, confronts Robo with a wanted poster of him.
2	"Moonbound and Down"	Teddy O'Connor	Matt Mariska & Andy Sipes	May 30, 2018
Dallas scares away the Stranger and the whole group head to Victor Goldsmith's new casino. Uncle Danny attempts to sell his trucking business to Victor, but he refuses due to his employees' behavior. They make a bet for Dallas to drive her truck to the moon, grab a New York style pizza and head back in 6 hours. In return, Dallas gets free booze for a year. Dallas and Robo manage to get the pizza and head back, though they run into trouble along the way, but the pizza is ruined. Fat Paul reveals that he orders a pizza every week in advance to make up for the 30 day travel resulting in Uncle Danny winning the bet anyway. Dallas gets her free booze for a year, but is not allowed to return to moon which she and Robo do not mind. As they celebrate, someone is spying on the group.
3	"I, Robo"	Stephen Evans	Suzanne Keilly	May 30, 2018
Fat Paul suddenly leaves and joins Moonshiner's Trucking's rival Phobos Trucking. Dallas and Robo head there to look for him, leaving Danny with no other choice, but to allow Woody to train his daughter Ellie to be a trucker. Dallas and Robo meet with Phobos owner Freddy Calhoun who claims that they did not kidnap Paul and that he came on his own. However, when he states that Dallas is his "second favorite" racer, she tries to prove him wrong. The duo discover that all of Calhoun's employees are robots, which is illegal, and Robo gives A.I. to one nicknamed Bright Eyes. However, Bright Eyes wants to destroy humanity and threatens Fat Paul. Dallas calls upon Ellie to drive Woody's truck into Calhoun's satellite which destroys his robots. With Fat Paul back, the gang celebrate. Elsewhere, Bright Eyes suddenly becomes active.
4	"Murder on the Georgia Overdrive"	Phil Andrews	Matt Mariska & Andy Sipes	May 30, 2018
A mysterious narrator tells the story of Dallas and Robo's recent adventure in which they end up in the middle of a solar flare causing their truck and Robo to continuously short circuit. They start rescuing drifters including Drs. Eichler, Gardner and Bunson and their intern Skip, a miner named Bruce, a homeless man named Beans, famous star and his ex Dickie and Vickie James St. James, salesman Whiskey Johnson and Woody. Dr. Gardner is suddenly killed forcing Dallas and Robo to solve the mystery. However, they cannot get anywhere and everyone is killed except for Woody, Eichler and Skip. Skip kills Eichler and reveals that he is a cannibal biker. They eject him into space and Dallas is revealed as the narrator telling Danny why they lost all of their cargo which he has a hard time believing. Fat Paul finds the dead bodies in space.
5	"The Joy of Cooking"	Teddy O'Connor	Story by : Suzanne Keilly, Matt Mariska, Mike Roberts, & Andy Sipes; Teleplay by : Suzanne Keilly, Matt Mariska, & Andy Sipes	May 30, 2018
Dallas and Robo are delivering expensive salt when they are stopped by Woody who is angered by them taking his load. To appease him, Robo sends him time travel coordinates which to their surprise actually works as he shows up in the truck. They decide to travel back in time to double their load, picking up more Dallas and Robos and unintentionally killing Woody in each timeline. Meanwhile, the rest of the Moonshiner Trucking company rewind when Ellie keeps finding different letters and ads leading to different outcomes. The original Dallas and Robo realize that their first copies have stolen their truck, but while catching up to them, it explodes due to the amount of salt being carried. Dallas loses herself to her clones, while Robo goes back in time and kills himself to make sure that the episode's events never happened.
6	"Le Mars"	Stephen Evans	Suzanne Keilly, Matt Mariska, & Andy Sipes	May 30, 2018
Victor hires Dallas to be his racer for the Golden Pathway #7 to which she readily accepts. However, when her rival Whiskey Johnson arrives and is revealed to be racing under Calhoun and Phobos, her fame and competitiveness gets to her head. Fat Paul and Woody start selling Dallas Moonshiner merchandise with Victor taking 20% of their profits. Dallas and Robo end up getting drunk due to being nervous and are arrested a day before the race. After sobering up, Dallas finally apologizes to her friends for her actions. Just before the race is set to begin, Dallas makes a bet with Calhoun that should she lose, she gives up her truck, the Georgia Overdrive. Despite playing fair, Whiskey Johnson wins by cheating due to Mars being unsanctioned. One week later, Dallas is seen having joined the Cannibal Biker gang with Carol.
7	"I Was a Teenage Cannibal Biker"	Phil Andrews	Matt Mariska	May 30, 2018
Dallas has been with the Cannibal Biker gang for weeks in an effort to capture Carol and claim her bounty so that she can buy back the Georgia Overdrive. She tells Carol that she had a falling out with Robo when in actuality, she left without telling him. While raiding a mine, Carol reveals that she is after special weapons so that the gang can attack Mars and repopulate. Dallas fakes her truck's engine failure so that they can stop by Phobos Trucking. She tries contacting Robo, but he hangs up on her. She finds Calhoun and they attempt to pull off kidnapping Carol, but they are double crossed by two lesser gang members and tied up. Bright Eyes is revealed to have been rebuilt by Calhoun and offers to join the bikers in taking over Mars. They blow up Phobos' generator leaving Dallas and Calhoun to die in the explosion.
8	"The Stranger, The Dummy, and The King"	Teddy O'Connor	Andy Sipes	May 30, 2018
Moonshiner Trucking is concerned about Dallas' disappearance. Danny decides to give Ellie her own truck; the Apollo 69, but is concerned about her new position. Robo has another confrontation with the Man in White and discovers that he is part robot due to his family having been killed by an A.I. Dallas and Calhoun are revealed to have escaped Phobos and arrive on Mars in time to see the Cannibal Bikers attack the citizens after the power is blown out. While Danny and Ellie rescue the citizens, Woody and Fat Paul try to reboot the power and fight and defeat Bright Eyes. Dallas and Robo reunite and capture Carol while also making up with each other. Robo gives the Man in White his time double so he can collect the bounty and Victor makes him a citizen of Mars. Dallas and Robo use the reward for Moonshiner Trucking.

== Production ==
=== Development ===
On August 4, 2017, it was announced that YouTube had given the production a series order for a first season consisting of eight half-hour episodes. The series was created by Mike Roberts and is set to be written by Matt Mariska and Andy Sipes. Executive producers are set to include Roberts, Mariska, Sipes, and John Cena. Production company and animation studio ShadowMachine, which has produced animated series including Robot Chicken and BoJack Horseman, produced the series.

=== Casting ===
Alongside the initial series announcement, it was reported that John Cena and Kat Dennings were cast in the series' lead roles of Robo and Dallas, respectively. The main cast is also set to be rounded out by Jane Lynch, Dana Snyder, Giancarlo Esposito, Clancy Brown, Bree Williamson, Nat Faxon, Taran Killam, and Milana Vayntrub.

== Release ==
=== Marketing ===
On May 4, 2018, YouTube Red released a series of promotional images from the series and announced that it would premiere on May 30, 2018. On May 18, 2018, the first trailer for the series was released.

== Reception ==
In a positive review, Forbes' Merrill Barr praised the series saying, "Dallas & Robo is something special and different while still feeling familiar and safe. It's the Fast & Furious to Futurama's Point Break. A heavily Groening inspired series that completely surprises in its competency, complexity and charm. It is absolutely must-see television and one of the top three series on YouTube Premium".
