= Milius (film) =

- Poster
- Directed by: Zak Knutson; Joey Figueroa
- Produced by: Zak Knutson; Joey Figueroa; Ken Plume
- Starring: John Milius
- Cinematography: Zak Knutson; Joey Figueroa; Jim Firios; Austin Nordell
- Edited by: Zak Knutson
- Music by: Daniel Sternbaum
- Distributed by: Studiocanal
- Release date: 2013
- Running time: 103 minutes
- Country: United States
- Language: English

Milius is a 2013 documentary film about the writer, producer, director John Milius, directed by Joey Figueroa and Zak Knutson.

== Plot ==
The film takes a look at the life and career of John Milius, from his childhood and days as a student at the University of Southern California, to his success as a writer and director on major films like Dirty Harry, Apocalypse Now and Red Dawn.

== Select interviewees ==
- Francis Ford Coppola
- Brian De Palma
- Clint Eastwood
- Sam Elliott
- Buzz Feitshans
- Harrison Ford
- Don Glut
- Kathleen Kennedy
- Randal Kleiser
- George Lucas
- Michael Mann
- Mike Medavoy
- Elvis Mitchell
- Ed O'Neill
- Al Ruddy
- Paul Schrader
- Arnold Schwarzenegger
- Martin Scorsese
- Charlie Sheen
- Bryan Singer
- Steven Spielberg
- Sylvester Stallone
- Oliver Stone
- Lea Thompson
- Matt Weiner

== Production ==
The film took five and a half years to make. The filmmakers were two and a half years into the project when Scott Mosier came on board with Matt Perniciero and Kevin Mann as executive producers to provide additional finance. Then Milius had a stroke and the film shut down for nine months while he started rehab.

According to co director Joey Figueroa:

Usually a lot of people will do a big documentary and they don't have their subject fully on board. We had John Milius on board from the get-go. And we were like, 'Wow! This man can speak. And this is going to be amazing, because he's so vocal and has like zero filter and he's just going to say all this shit that's going to be awesome'. And, obviously, if you've seen the film, you know what happens, so that changed the entire dynamic of how this documentary got made. Originally Milius was going to be our driving force in this picture and that totally got derailed. And we had to find this voice now, because we have to hear him speak, obviously. That's what made it a bit more difficult.

== Reception ==
On the review aggregator website Rotten Tomatoes, 94% of 16 critics' reviews are positive, with an average rating of 6.9/10. Metacritic, which uses a weighted average, assigned the film a score of 59 out of 100, based on 7 critics, indicating "mixed or average" reviews.
