= Clancy Brown =

American actor (born 1959)

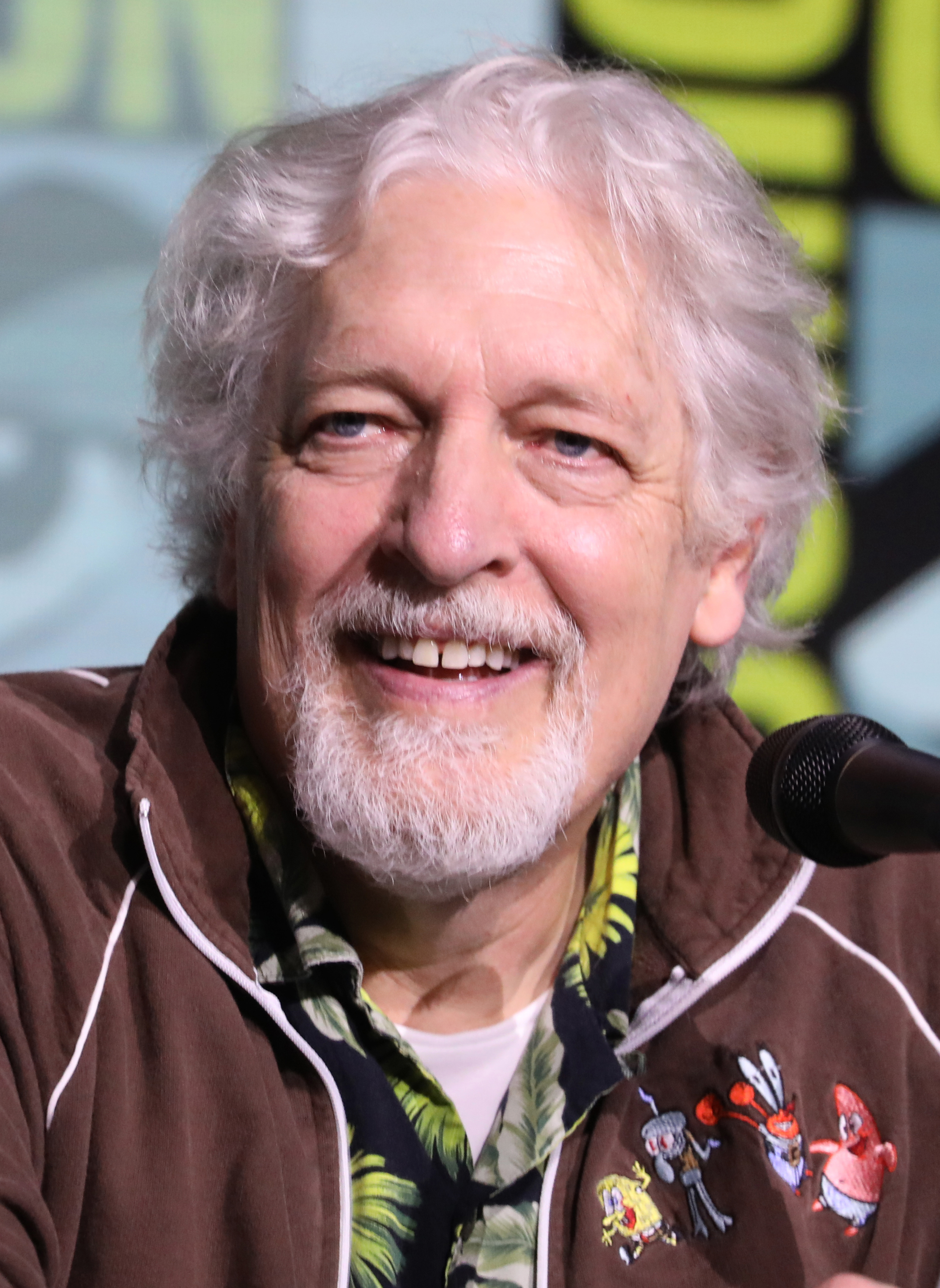
- Brown at the 2024 San Diego Comic-Con
- Born: January 5, 1959 (age 67); Urbana, Ohio, U.S.
- Education: Northwestern University (BS)
- Occupation: Actor
- Years active: 1983–present
- Spouse: Jeanne Johnson (m. 1993)
- Children: 2
- Father: Bud Brown
- Relatives: Clarence J. Brown (grandfather)

Clarence J. Brown III (born January 5, 1959) is an American actor. Prolific in film and television since the 1980s, Brown is often cast in villainous and authoritative roles.

His film roles include Rawhide in The Adventures of Buckaroo Banzai Across the 8th Dimension (1984), Frankenstein's monster in The Bride (1985), the Kurgan in Highlander (1986), Sheriff Gus Gilbert in Pet Sematary Two (1992), Capt. Byron Hadley in The Shawshank Redemption (1994), Sgt. Charles Zim in Starship Troopers (1997), Stanley Thomas in Promising Young Woman (2020), and the Harbinger in John Wick: Chapter 4 (2023). On television, he has played Brother Justin Crowe on the HBO series Carnivàle (2003–2005), Waylon "Jock" Jeffcoat on the Showtime series Billions (2018–2019, 2023), Kurt Caldwell on the Showtime series Dexter: New Blood (2021–2022), and Sal Maroni in The Penguin (2024).

Brown has voiced Lex Luthor in various DC Comics animated media since 1996 and Mr. Krabs on SpongeBob SquarePants since 1999. His other voice roles include Long Feng in Avatar: The Last Airbender (2006), Savage Opress in Star Wars: The Clone Wars (2011–2013), Surtur in Thor: Ragnarok (2017) and General Kregg in Invincible (2021–2026). In video games, he voiced Doctor Neo Cortex and Uka Uka in the Crash Bandicoot franchise (1997–2003) and performed the motion capture and voice of Hank Anderson in Detroit: Become Human (2018).

== Early life ==
Clarence J. Brown III was born on January 5, 1959, in Urbana, Ohio, and had an older sister, Beth, who died in 1964. Their mother, Joyce Helen (née Eldridge), was a conductor, composer and concert pianist. The siblings' father, Clarence J. "Bud" Brown Jr., was a newspaper publisher who helped manage the Brown Publishing Company, the family-owned newspaper business started by Clancy's grandfather, Congressman Clarence J. Brown. From 1965 to 1983, Bud Brown also served as a congressman, in the same seat as his own father, and later as Chairman of the Board of Brown Publishing. The family continued to operate the business until 2010.

Brown graduated from St. Albans School in Washington, D.C., and Northwestern University. At St. Albans, Brown performed the role of Deputy Governor Thomas Danforth in The Crucible.

== Career ==
=== Live-action performances ===
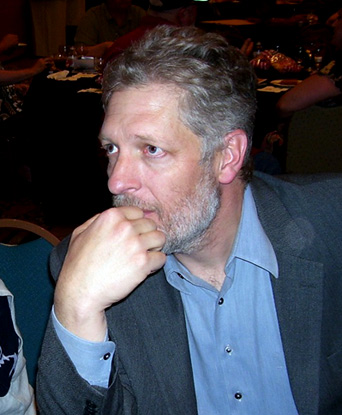
Brown in 2008

In Brown's first mainstream film, he was cast as Viking Lofgren alongside Sean Penn in the 1983 crime drama Bad Boys. He followed up as the sadistic Kurgan in the 1986 film Highlander, which failed in theaters but had more success on home video. Other eighties roles included Army mercenary Larry McRose in Walter Hill's Extreme Prejudice, killer Steve in Roger Spottiswoode's Shoot to Kill and Detective Nick Mann in Kathryn Bigelow's Blue Steel.

Brown has played prison officers in three films dealing with miscarriages of justice: the tyrannical Captain Byron Hadley in The Shawshank Redemption, the sympathetic Lt. Jimmy Williams in The Hurricane, and Lt. McMannis in Last Light. In 2001, he played a magical character credited as 'The granter of wishes' in the Hallmark version of Snow White. In 2007, he played the Viking leader opposite Karl Urban in Pathfinder.

He starred in several independent films in 2008: The Burrowers, screened at the Toronto International Film Festival in 2008, and released in the United States on DVD in April 2009, and The Twenty. He appeared in Steven Soderbergh's 2009 film The Informant! opposite Matt Damon in which he played an attorney. He also portrayed Alan Smith in Samuel Bayer's 2010 remake of the horror film A Nightmare on Elm Street. In 2011, he appeared in Cowboys & Aliens (directed by Jon Favreau) with Daniel Craig, Harrison Ford and Olivia Wilde. He was cast as the voice of The Goon in the animated feature film. He also starred as Albert Marconi in the film adaptation of the David Wong novel John Dies at the End, directed by Don Coscarelli.

Brown was a series regular on the science fiction series Earth 2 from 1994 to 1995, playing the role of John Danziger. Brown was notable as the sinister preacher Brother Justin Crowe in the HBO series Carnivàle. Though the series only ran for two seasons, Carnivàle has attained a cult popularity and his performance was applauded by critics for showcasing a new side to his acting talents. He also starred in the Showtime production In the Company of Spies and the HBO film Cast a Deadly Spell. As conservative United States Attorney General Jock Jeffcoat, he was one of the primary antagonists in seasons three and four of the Showtime series Billions.

He has also made many guest appearances on various television series including ER, the Star Trek: Enterprise episode "Desert Crossing" as Zobral, Lost as Kelvin Joe Inman, and former baseball player (and investment scam mark) Rudy Blue on The Riches. Brown also appeared as the frontiersman Simon Kenton, the key to America's westward expansion, in the 2000 Kentucky Educational Television production "A Walk with Simon Kenton". Kenton resembled Brown in stature and is buried in Brown's hometown. Brown most recently appeared as Hart Sterling, founding partner of fictional law firm Sterling, Huddle, Oppenheim & Craft in ABC's The Deep End. He also guest starred on the Leverage series episode "The Gone Fishin Job" and on The Dukes of Hazzard sixth-season episode "Too Many Roscos". He appeared on The CW's TV production of The Flash in the recurring guest-star role of General Wade Eiling. He has also portrayed Ray Schoonover in the Daredevil episodes "Guilty as Sin" and "The Dark at the End of the Tunnel" and The Punisher episode "Kandahar". He played Sheriff Joe Corbin in Sleepy Hollow. In January 2021, it was announced Brown had been cast in Showtime's Dexter revival Dexter: New Blood with a leading role as Kurt Caldwell. In 2022, Brown joined the cast of The Boys spin-off series Gen V as Richard "Rich Brink" Brinkerhoff. In 2025, Brown was cast as Big Hank Hickman in The CW’s series Good Cop/Bad Cop.

=== Voice-over work ===
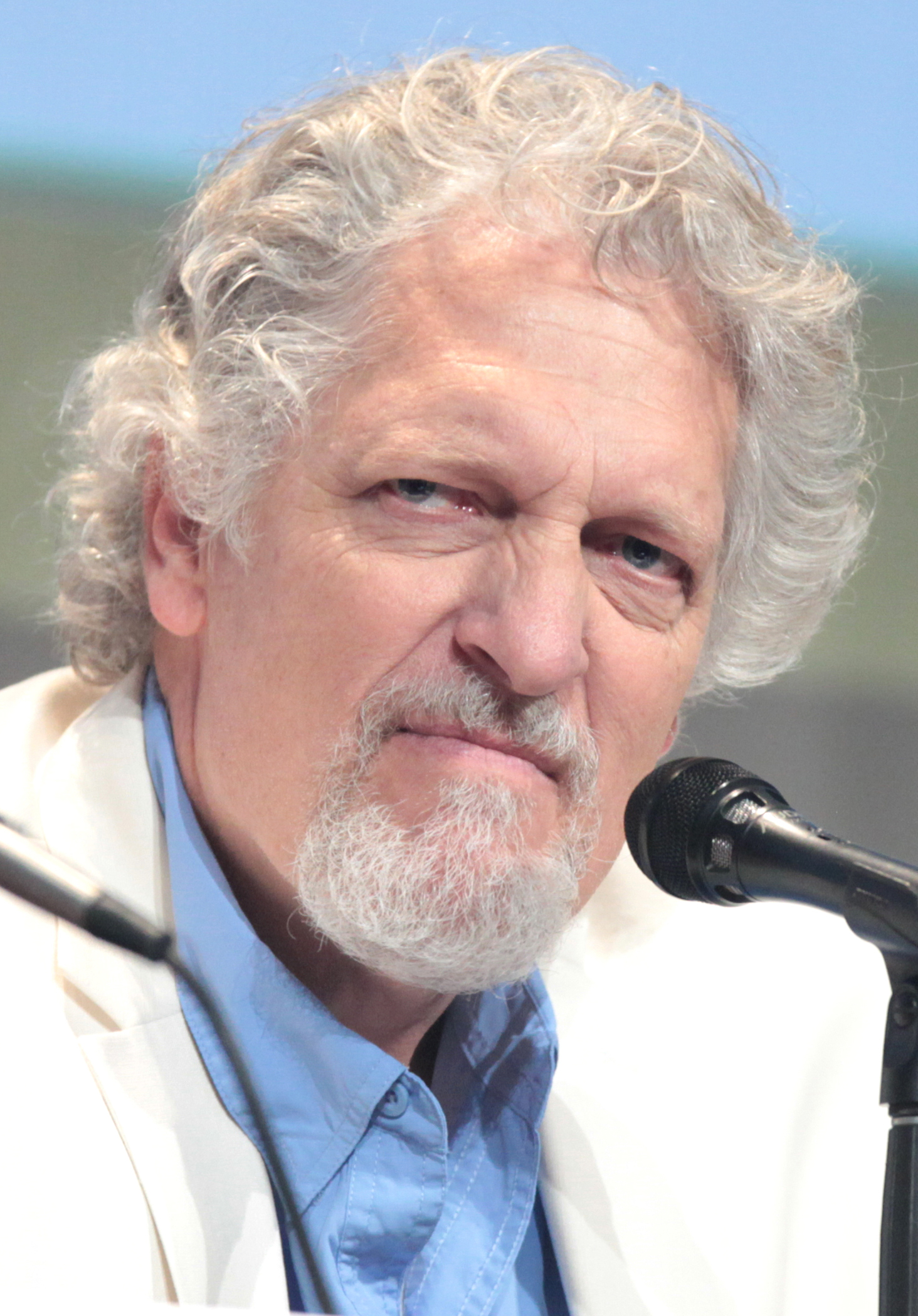
Brown at the 2015 San Diego Comic-Con

As a voice-over actor, Brown has appeared in various video games, usually playing an antagonistic character. He lends his voice to several of the crystallized dragons in the PlayStation game Spyro the Dragon. He voiced Paladin Rhombus in Fallout (1997). He voiced the corrupt Baron Praxis in the PlayStation 2 video game Jak II; Doctor Neo Cortex and Uka Uka in a number of the Crash Bandicoot video games; Montross (a Mandalorian rival of Jango Fett) in Star Wars: Bounty Hunter; Hades in God of War III; Thrall in the cancelled video game Warcraft Adventures: Lord of the Clans; Scourgelord Tyrannus in World of Warcraft: Wrath of the Lich King; the conniving Alderman Richard Hughes in the Xbox 360 game Saints Row; and the cynical, foul-mouthed Lt. Anderson in Detroit: Become Human.

For animated television series, he voiced several characters (Hakon, Tomas Brod and Wolf) in the series Gargoyles; Tanuki Gonta in the English language dub of Pom Poko (1994); Raiden on the animated series Mortal Kombat: Defenders of the Realm; a Hessian trooper in The Night of the Headless Horseman (1999); billionaire Maxmilian Speil in Godzilla: The Series; and five of the six members of Legion Ex Machina in Big Guy and Rusty the Boy Robot.

Since 1999, he has played the role of Mr. Krabs of SpongeBob SquarePants (as well the spinoffs and films The SpongeBob SquarePants Movie, The SpongeBob Movie: Sponge Out of Water, and The SpongeBob Movie: Sponge on the Run). The show celebrated its 20th anniversary in 2019. In celebration, a television special was aired, titled "SpongeBob's Big Birthday Blowout". One scene includes each of the show's main characters' voice actors portraying live-action versions of their characters. While not the first Spongebob Squarepants episode that blended animated sequences with live-action characters, this was the first time that the characters' voice actors have all played a live-action scene all together. From 2000 to 2005, he played several roles (Captain Black, Ratso and the animated moose doll Super Moose) on Jackie Chan Adventures. He also voiced Vice-Principal Pangborn in All Grown Up!, Barkmeat in Catscratch, Otto in Super Robot Monkey Team Hyperforce Go! (which also stars fellow SpongeBob co-star Tom Kenny, who voices Gibson) and Gorrath in Megas XLR.

For Disney, he has played roles such as the Dark Dragon in American Dragon: Jake Long, the Ugly Bald Guy in the film Recess: School's Out, as well as Undertow in The Little Mermaid II: Return to the Sea, and he also made a guest appearance in the Kim Possible episode "Oh, No! Yono" where he played the titular character. He also voiced King Frederick in the Disney Channel series Rapunzel's Tangled Adventure and the Disney Channel film Tangled: Before Ever After.

For Nickelodeon, Brown has voiced several characters in the Avatar franchise, such as corrupt Dai Li leader Long Feng in Avatar: The Last Airbender in 2006 and top gangster Yakone in The Legend of Korra in 2012. He guest-starred in the Season 1 episodes of Adventure Time, Dungeon as the Demon Cat, and Ocean of Fear as the narrator for the opening and closing quotes. Brown also voices Destro in G.I. Joe: Renegades; Jeff Fischer's biological father in American Dad!; Grune the Destroyer in the ThunderCats reboot; and the recurring role of Agent Silas in Transformers: Prime.

From 2011 to 2013, Brown voiced Savage Opress, Count Dooku's new apprentice and Darth Maul's brother, in Star Wars: The Clone Wars. He starred as Chris Bradford, Shredder's top henchman, in the 2012 Teenage Mutant Ninja Turtles television series. From the third quarter of 2014, Brown began doing voice-overs as the main talent for Chevy truck national and regional television commercials. On March 21, 2016, Brown began voicing a new character to the series, Red Death, a parody of the Marvel villain Red Skull, in The Venture Brothers episode "Red Means Stop". He continued this role in season 7, and was signed to appear in season 8 before the show's cancellation. Since 2021, he has provided various voices for the Amazon Prime Video series Invincible.

==== DC Comics media ====
Brown is well known for voicing the villainous Lex Luthor in various animated media since 1996. He first voiced Luthor in the DC Animated Universe (DCAU), starting with Superman: The Animated Series (where he had originally auditioned for the role of Superman) and reprised his role in the subsequent animated series Justice League and Justice League Unlimited. He also voiced the character in the video game Superman: Shadow of Apokolips as well as The Batman cartoon series. Brown later again played Luthor in the 2009 animated film Superman/Batman: Public Enemies. He also voiced a character under the name Rohtul (which is Luthor spelled backwards) in Batman: Brave and the Bold (while Kevin Michael Richardson provided the voice of the actual character). Brown once again voiced Lex in the video games Lego Batman 2: DC Super Heroes, Lego Batman 3: Beyond Gotham and Lego DC Super-Villains. From all these vocal appearances, Brown has played Lex Luthor longer than any other actor in history, including his own Justice League co-star Michael Rosenbaum (in Smallville).

Brown is also known for his voice work as villains in various DC animated series, films, television shows, and video games: Charlie "Big Time" Bigelow on Batman Beyond, Trident on Teen Titans, Mr. Freeze and Bane on The Batman, Per Degaton in Batman: The Brave and the Bold, Parallax in the live-action Green Lantern film, King Faraday in Young Justice, and Zartok in Green Lantern: The Animated Series. He appeared on The CW's The Flash recurring in the first season as General Wade Eiling, and on HBO's The Penguin as Sal Maroni.

==== Marvel Comics media ====
Brown has also voiced various Marvel characters in various animated projects: Sasquatch in The Incredible Hulk (1996), several characters (George Stacy, Rhino and Ox) in The Spectacular Spider-Man, Mister Sinister in Wolverine and the X-Men, Odin in Avengers: Earth's Mightiest Heroes, and Red Hulk and Taskmaster in Hulk and the Agents of S.M.A.S.H. and Ultimate Spider-Man. In Daredevil and The Punisher, he plays Major Schoonover, Frank Castle's former commanding officer. In Thor: Ragnarok, he voices the fire demon Surtur.

== Activism ==
On March 30, 2012, the Screen Actors Guild (SAG) and the American Federation of Television and Radio Artists (AFTRA) completed a merger of equals forming a new union SAG-AFTRA. As a result of this merger, a group of actors including Brown, fellow voice actors Michael Bell, Wendy Schaal, Schaal's former stepmother Valerie Harper, and other actors including former SAG President Edward Asner, Martin Sheen, Ed Harris, and Nancy Sinatra immediately sued against the current SAG President Ken Howard and several SAG Vice Presidents to overturn the merger and separate the (now merged) two unions because of their claims that the election was improper. The plaintiffs dropped their lawsuit several months later.

== Personal life ==
Brown has been married to Jeanne Johnson since 1993. They have two children.

Brown is involved in charity organizations, supporting the Beth Brown Memorial Fund named after his late sister, which offers scholarships to students who want to study pediatric healthcare. In 1999 he spearheaded a charity campaign to support J. Madison Wright, his on-screen daughter from Earth 2, who needed a heart transplant. He has also given back to his Alma mater the Northwestern University through benefit performances.

In a 2023 interview with NPR, Brown said that he came from a "very long legacy of Republican ideology - back when they had an ideology." His father, Bud Brown, died from COVID-19 complications the previous year.

== Filmography ==
=== Live-action ===
==== Film ====
List of acting performances in films
Year	Title	Role	Notes
1983	Bad Boys	"Viking" Lofgren	
1984	The Adventures of Buckaroo Banzai Across the 8th Dimension	"Rawhide"	
1985	Thunder Alley	"Weasel"	
1985	The Bride	Viktor	
1986	Highlander	Victor Kruger / The Kurgan	
1987	Extreme Prejudice	Master Sergeant Larry McRose	
1988	Shoot to Kill	Steve	
1988	Moonwalker	Police Officer	Segment: "Speed Demon"
1989	Season of Fear	Ward St. Clair	
1990	Blue Steel	Detective Nick Mann	
1990	Waiting for the Light	Joe	
1991	Ambition	Albert Merrick	
1991	Past Midnight	Steve Lundy	
1992	Pet Sematary Two	Sheriff Gus Gilbert	Nominated – Fangoria Chainsaw Award for Best Supporting Actor
1994	The Shawshank Redemption	Captain Byron Hadley	
1995	Dead Man Walking	State Trooper	
1996	Female Perversions	John	
1997	Starship Troopers	Sergeant Charlie Zim	
1997	Flubber	Smith	
1999	Claire Makes It Big	Frank	Short film
1999	The Hurricane	Lieutenant Jimmy Williams	
2000	Chump Change	The Man	
2002	The Laramie Project	Rob Debree	
2003	The Making of Daniel Boone	Allan Kenton	Also executive producer
2003	Normal	Frank	
2004	Finding Neo	Captain Hadme	Short film
2004	Gambling	The Reverend	
2005	Dogg's Hamlet, Cahoot's Macbeth	Dogg	
2006	The Guardian	Captain William Hadley	
2007	Pathfinder	Gunnar	
2007	Parker	Max Crenna	Short film
2008	The Burrowers	John Clay	
2008	The Express: The Ernie Davis Story	Roy Simmons	
2008	NASA Seals	Stone	Short film
2009	Slap	Joe	Short film
2009	The Twenty	John Simmonds	
2009	The Informant!	Aubrey Daniel	
2010	A Nightmare on Elm Street	Alan Smith	
2011	Cowboys & Aliens	Preacher Meacham	
2012	John Dies at the End	Dr. Albert Marconi	
2012	At Any Price	Jim Johnson	
2012	Hellbenders	Father Angus	
2013	Sparks	Archer	
2013	Water & Power	Turnvil	
2013	Nothing Left to Fear	Pastor Kingsman	
2013	Homefront	Sheriff Keith Rodrigue	
2013	The Trials of Cate McCall	Brinkeroff	
2013	I Know That Voice	Himself	Documentary
2014	Just Before I Go	Ted's Dad	
2014	When the Game Stands Tall	Mickey Ryan	
2014	99 Homes	Mr. Freeman	
2016	Hail, Caesar!	Gracchus	
2016	Warcraft	Blackhand	Voice and motion capture
2017	Little Evil	Reverend Gospel	
2017	Stronger	Jeff Bauman Sr.	
2017	Chappaquiddick	US Secretary of Defense Robert McNamara	
2018	Supercon	Adam King	
2018	The Ballad of Buster Scruggs	Joe "Surly Joe"	Segment: "The Ballad of Buster Scruggs"
2019	The Mortuary Collection	Montgomery Dark	Also executive producer Fangoria Chainsaw Award for Best Supporting Actor
2020	Promising Young Woman	Stanley Thomas	
2020	In Search of Darkness: Part II	Himself	Documentary
2022	Last Looks	Jim "Big Jim" Cuddy	
2022	In Search of Tomorrow	Himself	Documentary
2023	Scrambled	Richard	
2023	John Wick: Chapter 4	The Harbinger	
2023	Poolman	Theodore Hollandaise	
2023	Dumb Money	Steve Gill	
2024	The Fix	The Chairman	
2024	Audrey's Children	C. Everett Koop	
2025	The Addiction of Hope	Riz	
2025	Regretting You	Hank Adams	
2025	The SpongeBob Movie: Search for SquarePants	Pirate	
TBA	Nightwatching †	TBA	Filming

==== Television ====
List of acting performances in television shows
Year	Title	Role	Notes
1983	The Dukes of Hazzard	Kelly	Episode: "Too Many Roscos"
1987	Corridos: Tales of Passion & Revolution	John Reed	Television film
1987	The Room Upstairs	Kevin	Television film
1987	The Man Who Broke 1,000 Chains	Flagg	Television film
1989	Fair Game	Earl Dunning	Television film
1990	China Beach	Joey	Episode: "Strange Brew"
1990	Johnny Ryan	Johnny Ryan	Television film
1991	Love, Lies and Murder	David Brown	2 episodes
1991	Cast a Deadly Spell	Harry Bordon	Television film
1992	Revenge of the Nerds III: The Next Generation	Clarence	Television film
1993	Tales from the Crypt	Roger Lassen	Episode: "Half-Way Horrible"
1993	Desperate Rescue: The Cathy Malone Story	Dave Chattelier	Television film
1993	Bloodlines: Murder in the Family	Ben Guardino	Television film
1993	Last Light	Lieutenant Lionel McMannis	Television film
1994–1995	Earth 2	John Danziger	21 episodes
1995	The Outer Limits	Sergeant Linden Styles	Episode: "Afterlife"
1995	Donor Unknown	Nash Creed	Television film
1996	Radiant City	Al Goodman	Television film
1996	Desert Breeze	Unknown	Pilot
1997–1998	ER	Dr. Ellis West	7 episodes
1998	The Patron Saint of Liars	Son	Television film
1999	Vendetta	Chief Hennessey	Television film
1999	In the Company of Spies	Dale Beckham	Television film
1999	The Caseys	Pete Casey	Pilot
2000	The Practice	District Attorney Fox	2 episodes
2000	Yesterday's Children	Doug Cole	Television film
2001	Boss of Bosses	Andris Kurins	Television film
2001	Snow White: The Fairest of Them All	The Granter of Wishes	Television film
2002	Star Trek: Enterprise	Zobral	Episode: "Desert Crossing"
2002	Breaking News	Peter Kozyck	13 episodes
2002	Red Skies	Edgar Sterling	Television film
2003–2005	Carnivàle	Brother Justin Crowe	24 episodes
2006	Lost	Kelvin Inman	3 episodes
2007	The Riches	Rudy Blue	Episode: "X Spots the Mark"
2008	Law & Order	Sheriff John Burkhart	Episode: "Knock Off"
2008	Blank Slate	Agent Miles McAvoy	Television film
2010	The Deep End	Hart Sterling	6 episodes
2010	Leverage	Hugh Whitman	Episode: "The Gone Fishin' Job"
2010	Medium	Rob Walcott	Episode: "Where Were You When...?"
2011	Aim High	Boris "The Bear" Klopov	5 episodes
2012	The Frontier	Jack Ramsay, Lamazee	Pilot
2013	The Surgeon General	Becker	Pilot
2013–2016	Sleepy Hollow	Sheriff August Corbin	6 episodes
2014	The Trip to Bountiful	Sheriff	Television film
2014	Agatha	Hank	Pilot
2014–2015	The Flash	General Wade Eiling	4 episodes
2015–2016	Chicago P.D.	Eddie	3 episodes
2016	Daredevil	Colonel Ray Schoonover	2 episodes
2017	The Punisher	Major Ray Schoonover	Episode: "Kandahar"
2018–2019	The Goldbergs	Mr. Crosby	4 episodes
2018–2019, 2023	Billions	Waylon "Jock" Jeffcoat	17 episodes
2019	The Crown	Lyndon B. Johnson	Episode: "Margaretology"
2019	The Mandalorian	Burg	Episode: "Chapter 6: The Prisoner"
2019	SpongeBob's Big Birthday Blowout	Mr. Slabs	Television film
2019	Schooled	Mr. Crosby	5 episodes
2019–2020	Emergence	Ed Sawyer	13 episodes
2021–2022	Dexter: New Blood	Kurt Caldwell	8 episodes
2023	Ahsoka	Ryder Azadi	Episode: "Part One: Master and Apprentice"
2023	Gen V	Prof. Richard "Rich Brink" Brinkerhoff	2 episodes
2024	The Penguin	Salvatore Maroni	5 episodes
2025	Good Cop/Bad Cop	Big Hank Hickman	8 episodes
2026	Fallout	Last President of the United States	2 episodes
2026	High Potential	Nick Wagner, Sr.	2 episodes
2026	I Will Find You	Nicky Fisher	2 episodes

=== Voice roles ===
==== Film ====
List of voice performances in films
Year	Title	Role	Notes
1995	Gargoyles the Movie: The Heroes Awaken	Hakon	Direct-to-video
1997	Annabelle's Wish	Lawyer, Sheriff	Direct-to-video
1998	The Jungle Book: Mowgli's Story	Akela	Direct-to-video
1999	The Night of the Headless Horseman	Tale Teller	
2000	The Little Mermaid II: Return to the Sea	Undertow	Direct-to-video
2001	Recess: School's Out	Bald Guy	
2003	Atlantis: Milo's Return	Edgar Volgud	Direct-to-video
2004	The SpongeBob SquarePants Movie	Mr. Krabs	
2005	Pom Poko	Gonta	English dub
2009	Superman/Batman: Public Enemies	Lex Luthor	Direct-to-video
2011	Green Lantern	Parallax	
2013	Lego Batman: The Movie – DC Super Heroes Unite	Lex Luthor	Direct-to-video
2014	Iron Man & Captain America: Heroes United	Taskmaster	Direct-to-video
2015	The SpongeBob Movie: Sponge Out of Water	Mr. Krabs	
2017	Thor: Ragnarok	Surtur	
2019	Lady and the Tramp	Isaac	
2020	The SpongeBob Movie: Sponge on the Run	Mr. Krabs	
2023	The Venture Bros.: Radiant Is the Blood of the Baboon Heart	Red Death	Direct-to-video
2024	Saving Bikini Bottom: The Sandy Cheeks Movie	Mr. Krabs, Clyde, additional voices	
2025	Plankton: The Movie	Mr. Krabs, Gordon Plankton	
2025	The SpongeBob Movie: Search for SquarePants	Mr. Krabs, Narrator	

==== Television ====
List of voice performances in animated shows
Year	Title	Role	Notes
1994	The Little Mermaid	Octopin Leader	Episode: "Heroes"
1994–1996	Gargoyles	Hakkon, Wolf, Tomas Brod	12 episodes
1996	Mortal Kombat: Defenders of the Realm	Raiden	13 episodes
1996	The Incredible Hulk	Sasquatch	Episode: "Man to Man, Beast to Beast"
1996–1997	The Mighty Ducks	Siege	23 episodes
1996–2000	Superman: The Animated Series	Lex Luthor	19 episodes
1997	The Real Adventures of Jonny Quest	Colonel Nikola, The Entity, Professor Francois	2 episodes
1997	The Legend of Calamity Jane	Wild Bill Hickok	13 episodes
1997	Extreme Ghostbusters	Tempus	Episode: "Ghost Apocalyptic Future"
1997	Hey Arnold!	Porkpie	Episode: "Freeze Frame"
1997–1998	The New Adventures of Zorro	Additional voices	26 episodes
1998	Cow and Chicken	Policeman, Wheelchair Guy	Episode: "Stay Awake"
1998	Hercules	Blotox	Episode: "Hercules and the Techno Greeks"
1998	The Secret Files of the Spy Dogs	Baron Bone	Episode: "Bone"
1998	The Lionhearts	Butch	Episode: "But Some of My Best Friends Are Clowns"
1998–2000	Voltron: The Third Dimension	IGOR, Robot Maximus, Pilot	5 episodes
1999	Timon & Pumbaa	Angry Man	Episode: "Boo Hoo Bouquet"
1999	The Angry Beavers	Harrington	Episode: "In Search of Big Byoo-Tox"
1999	Godzilla: The Series	Maxmillian Spiel	2 episodes
1999	The Night of the Headless Horseman	Hessian Trooper	Television film
1999–2001	Big Guy and Rusty the Boy Robot	Legion Ex Machina #1–5	26 episodes
1999–present	SpongeBob SquarePants	Mr. Krabs, additional voices	
2000	Roughnecks: Starship Troopers Chronicles	Sergeant Charlie Zim	3 episodes
2000	Recess	Lieutenant LaMaise	Episode: "The Army Navy Game"
2000	Histeria!	Wild Bill Hickok	Episode: "North America"
2000	Buzz Lightyear of Star Command	Tough	Episode: "Haunted Moon"
2000	Batman Beyond	Charlie "Big Time" Bigelow	Episode: "Betrayal"
2000	Teacher's Pet	Fifth Grade Teacher	2 episodes
2000–2005	Jackie Chan Adventures	Captain Black, Ratso, additional voices	67 episodes
2001	The Zeta Project	Sheriff Morgan	Episode: "Hicksburg"
2001–2003	Justice League	Lex Luthor	8 episodes
2001–2004	Lloyd in Space	Officer Frank Horton	12 episodes
2002	The Powerpuff Girls	Mascumax	Episode: "Members Only"
2002	Samurai Jack	Dragon	Episode: "Jack and the Farting Dragon"
2003	Spider-Man: The New Animated Series	Raymond	Episode: "Sword of Shikata"
2003	Teen Titans	Trident	Episode: "Deep Six"
2003–2007	All Grown Up!	Vice Principal Pangborn, additional voices	10 episodes
2004	Duck Dodgers	Archduke Zag	Episode: "Pig Planet"
2004	Dave the Barbarian	Gronch, Iapetus, Puppets, Octopus	2 episodes
2004	Brandy & Mr. Whiskers	Sarge	Episode: "Private Antics, Major Problems"
2004–2005	Megas XLR	Gorrath, additional voices	10 episodes
2004–2006	Justice League Unlimited	Lex Luthor	13 episodes
2004–2006	Super Robot Monkey Team Hyperforce Go!	Otto, additional voices	52 episodes
2004–2007	The Batman	Mr. Freeze, Bane, Lex Luthor	6 episodes
2005	Catscratch	Barkmeat	Episode: "Off the Leash"
2005	The Life and Times of Juniper Lee	Nestor	Episode: "Monster Con"
2005–2006	A.T.O.M.	Alexander Paine	12 episodes
2005, 2007	Kim Possible	Commander Kane, Yono the Destroyer	2 episodes
2005–2007	American Dragon: Jake Long	Dark Dragon	3 episodes
2006	Lilo & Stitch: The Series	Mortlegax, Firefighter	Episode: "Ace"
2006	Avatar: The Last Airbender	Long Feng	5 episodes
2006–2007	Biker Mice from Mars	Cataclysm	12 episodes
2007	Ben 10	Kenko	Episode: "Game Over"
2007	El Tigre: The Adventures of Manny Rivera	Monsterzuma	Episode: "Bride of Puma Loco"
2007–2010, 2021	American Dad!	Henry Fischer, additional voices	4 episodes
2008	Ben 10: Alien Force	Dragon	Episode: "Be-Knighted"
2008–2009	Wolverine and the X-Men	Mister Sinister	3 episodes
2008–2009	The Spectacular Spider-Man	George Stacy, Rhino, Ox	16 episodes
2009	Phineas and Ferb	The Regurgitator, Santa Claus, additional voices	5 episodes
2009	The Secret Saturdays	Dr. Bara	Episode: "Shadows of Lemuria"
2010	Batman: The Brave and the Bold	Per Degaton, Rohtul	2 episodes
2010	Kick Buttowski: Suburban Daredevil	Magnus Magnuson	3 episodes
2010	Adventure Time	Narrator, Demon Cat, Evil Guy	2 episodes
2010–2011	G.I. Joe: Renegades	Destro	6 episodes
2010–2011	The Penguins of Madagascar	Buck Rockgut	3 episodes
2010–2012	The Avengers: Earth's Mightiest Heroes	Odin	3 episodes
2010–2013	Pound Puppies	Salty	8 episodes
2011	ThunderCats	Grune	6 episodes
2011	Wallaby Run	Red	US version Television film
2011–2013	Transformers: Prime	Silas	8 episodes
2011–2013	Star Wars: The Clone Wars	Savage Opress	8 episodes
2012	Young Justice	King Faraday	Episode: "Performance"
2012	Green Lantern: The Animated Series	General Zartok	2 episodes
2012	The Legend of Korra	Yakone	2 episodes
2012–2013	Scooby-Doo! Mystery Incorporated	Hebediah Grim, Evil Entity	3 episodes
2012–2017	Ultimate Spider-Man	Taskmaster, Red Hulk, Ben Parker / Phantom Rider	11 episodes
2012–2017	Teenage Mutant Ninja Turtles	Chris Bradford / Dogpound / Rahzar	30 episodes
2013	Wander Over Yonder	Badlands Dan	Episode: "The Bad Guy"
2013	Kung Fu Panda: Legends of Awesomeness	Pei Mei	Episode: "Five is Enough"
2013	Dark Minions	Drebnor	Pilot
2013	DC Nation Shorts	Negative Man, General Immortus	3 episodes
2013	Sofia the First	Constable Myles	3 episodes
2013–2015	Hulk and the Agents of S.M.A.S.H.	Thunderbolt Ross / Red Hulk, Uatu, Hogun, Black Bolt, Supreme Intelligence, additional voices	52 episodes
2014	Archer	Ricky	Episode: "Archer Vice: Baby Shower"
2014	TripTank	Additional voices	3 episodes
2014	Robot Chicken DC Comics Special 2: Villains in Paradise	Gorilla Grodd	Television special
2014–2019	Avengers Assemble	Uatu the Watcher, Red Hulk, Taskmaster	10 episodes
2015	Axe Cop	Additional voices	3 episodes
2015	Golan the Insatiable	Old Man	Episode: "Pilot"
2015	Mickey Mouse	Pig Biker	Episode: "Road Hogs"
2015	Pickle and Peanut	Additional voices	Episode: "Greg/Gramma Jail"
2015–2018	Star Wars Rebels	Ryder Azadi	12 episodes
2016	Sheriff Callie's Wild West	Wildcat McGraw	Episode: "How the Water Was Won/Double Trouble"
2016	The Adventures of Puss in Boots	Bloodwolf	Episode: "The Bloodwolf"
2016–2018	Trollhunters: Tales of Arcadia	Gunmar	28 episodes
2016–2018	The Venture Bros.	Red Death	4 episodes
2016–2019	Milo Murphy's Law	Javier, Mr. Blunt	2 episodes
2017–2018	Stretch Armstrong and the Flex Fighters	Jack Kinland / Smokestack	2 episodes
2017, 2020	Rick and Morty	Risotto Groupon, Vengeful Train Passenger	2 episodes
2017	OK K.O.! Let's Be Heroes	Mr. Cardsley, Powio Statue, Pavel	Episode: "No More Pow Cards"
2017	Tangled: Before Ever After	King Frederic	Television film
2017–2020	Rapunzel's Tangled Adventure	King Frederic	24 episodes
2018	Dallas & Robo	The Stranger	4 episodes
2018	3Below: Tales of Arcadia	Gunmar	Episode: "Lightning in a Bottle"
2018–2019	The Epic Tales of Captain Underpants	Mr. Ree, Splotch	4 episodes
2019	Niko and the Sword of Light	Otto the Automatron	2 episodes
2019	Mao Mao: Heroes of Pure Heart	Shin Mao	Episode: "Small"
2019	SpongeBob's Big Birthday Blowout	Mr. Krabs	Television film
2020	DuckTales	Frankenstein's Monster	Episode: "The Trickening!"
2020	Wizards: Tales of Arcadia	Gunmar	5 episodes
2020	The Wonderful World of Mickey Mouse	Big Bad Wolf	Episode: "The Big Good Wolf"
2021	Calls	General Wilson	2 episodes
2021–2023	What If...?	Surtur	3 episodes
2021–2024	Kamp Koral: SpongeBob's Under Years	Mr. Krabs, additional voices	38 episodes
2021–present	The Patrick Star Show	Mr. Krabs, additional voices	
2021–present	Invincible	Damien Darkblood, General Kregg, Ka-Hor	14 episodes
2022	El Deafo	Mr. Potts, P. Evil	3 episodes
2022	Tales of the Jedi	Eleventh Brother	Episode: "Resolve"
2022	The Exodite	Kelseth the Exodite	2 episodes
2022–2024	Solar Opposites	Cromus, Judge, Gavin	6 episodes
2022–2025	Transformers: EarthSpark	Quintus Prime	8 episodes
2023	Digman!	Yedward	Episode: "Fear of GAWD"
2024	Invincible Fight Girl	Mega Beefpuncha	2 episodes
2024–2025	Resident Alien	Mantid	5 episodes
2025	Big City Greens	Chocolate Santa	Episode: "Chocolate Santa"
2026	Star Wars: Maul – Shadow Lord	Savage Opress	Episode: "The Creeping Fear"
2026	Mating Season	Robert	4 episodes
2026	Cyberpunk: Edgerunners 2	Weak Kingsley	English dub

==== Video games ====
List of voice performances in video games
Year	Title	Role	Notes
1997	Lands of Lore: Guardians of Destiny	The Draracle, Dracoid, Large Imp	
1997	Crash Bandicoot 2: Cortex Strikes Back	Doctor Neo Cortex	
1997	Fallout	Rhombus	
1998	Spyro the Dragon	Additional voices	
1998	Crash Bandicoot: Warped	Doctor Neo Cortex, Uka Uka	
1999	Crash Team Racing	Doctor Neo Cortex, Uka Uka	
1999	Lands of Lore III	Draracle, Celerian	
2000	Crash Bash	Doctor Neo Cortex	
2001	Crash Bandicoot: The Wrath of Cortex	Doctor Neo Cortex, Uka Uka	
2002	Run Like Hell	Dag'rek	
2002	SpongeBob SquarePants: Employee of the Month	Mr. Krabs	
2002	Run Like Hell: Hunt or Be Hunted	Dag'rek	
2002	Star Wars: Bounty Hunter	Montross	
2002	Minority Report: Everybody Runs	John Anderton	
2002	SpongeBob SquarePants: Revenge of the Flying Dutchman	Mr. Krabs	
2003	Nickelodeon Toon Twister 3D	Mr. Krabs	
2003	Superman: Shadow of Apokolips	Lex Luthor	
2003	Jak II	Baron Praxis	
2003	Crash Nitro Kart	Doctor Neo Cortex, Uka Uka	
2004	Jak 3	Baron Praxis	
2004	The SpongeBob SquarePants Movie	Mr. Krabs	
2005	SpongeBob SquarePants: Lights, Camera, Pants!	Mr. Krabs	
2005	Sly 3: Honor Among Thieves	Lieutenant Gronk	Uncredited
2006	Saints Row	Alderman Richard Hughes	
2007	Avatar: The Last Airbender – The Burning Earth	Long Feng	
2010	God of War III	Hades	
2012	Lego Batman 2: DC Super Heroes	Lex Luthor	
2012	Call of Duty: Black Ops II	Strike Force Soldier	
2012	PlayStation All-Stars Battle Royale	Baron Praxis	
2013	SpongeBob SquarePants: Plankton's Robotic Revenge	Mr. Krabs	
2014	Lichdom: Battlemage	Roth	
2014	Lego Batman 3: Beyond Gotham	Lex Luthor	
2014	Teenage Mutant Ninja Turtles: Danger of the Ooze	Rahzar	
2015	SpongeBob HeroPants	Mr. Krabs	
2016	Hammer 2: Reloaded	Hammer	
2017	Mass Effect: Andromeda	Alec Ryder	
2018	Detroit: Become Human	Lieutenant Hank Anderson	Also motion capture
2018	Lego DC Super-Villains	Lex Luthor	
2023	SpongeBob SquarePants: The Cosmic Shake	Mr. Krabs	
2023	Nickelodeon All-Star Brawl 2	Mr. Krabs	
2024	Funko Fusion	Eddy Funko	
2024	SpongeBob SquarePants: The Patrick Star Game	Mr. Krabs	
2025	SpongeBob SquarePants: Titans of the Tide	Mr. Krabs, Slammer, Ol' Boomer, Citizens	
2026	Cyberpunk 2077	Weak Kingsley	Edgerunners 2 Update

List of voice performances in theme parks
Year	Title	Role	Notes
2003	Jimmy Neutron's Nicktoon Blast	Mr. Krabs	
2005	SpongeBob SquarePants 4-D	Mr. Krabs	

==== Documentaries ====
Interviews
Year	Title	Role	Notes
2013	Necessary Evil: Super-Villains of DC Comics	Himself	
