= Fred Entertainment =

Pop-culture website

- Website type: Entertainment, pop culture
- Owner: Ken Plume
- Creator: Kevin Smith
- Website: asitecalledfred.com
- Commercial: Yes
- Registration: Optional
- Launched: 2001

Fred Entertainment (formerly Movie Poop Shoot and later Quick Stop Entertainment) is a pop-culture website. The site was founded as Movie Poop Shoot by director Kevin Smith to promote the 2001 movie Jay and Silent Bob Strike Back. The site served as the launching pad for SModcast, Smith's popular comedy podcast. In early 2010, Smith released control of the site over to editor Ken Esteban Plume, who re-branded the site as Fred Entertainment.

Quick Stop Entertainment became Fred Entertainment on January 1, 2010. It was taken over and is now owned by Ken Plume, former editor of Quick Stop Entertainment.

== History ==
Quick Stop Entertainment's original incarnation as "MoviePoopShoot.com" was set up as a parody of websites such as "Ain't It Cool News", and was featured in Jay and Silent Bob Strike Back.

The site began producing editorial content on June 17, 2002 under editor Chris Ryall. Ryall ran the website for four years until 2005, when he left for IDW Publishing. In May 2006, the site was named Quick Stop Entertainment after the hiring of new editor Ken Plume, one of the founding members of IGN FilmForce.

The site's staff also makes appearances at fan-conventions, and in 2008 hosted a panel at Dragon Con, in Atlanta, Georgia in 2008 which featured the members of Snydecast and Cabin Fever. Quick Stop also co-hosts the Gonzo Film Festival (founded by Ken Plume and Widgett Walls in 2003) with needcoffee.com on the Saturday of the event.

In 2008, Ken Plume created the online songwriting contest, "The Masters of Song Fu." The contest is described as a songwriting version of Iron Chef, the competitors are presented with a very specific songwriting challenge. They are given one week to complete their songs - however they see fit, within the parameters set forth - after which time the entries are voted on by the public. After three preliminary rounds, the challenger who has received the most votes goes head to head against one of the "Masters of Song Fu" in a single song battle. This song is also voted on by the public and the winner is crowned the "Master of Song Fu!" Masters of Song Fu is now a regular feature of ASiteCalledFRED.com.

The winners of Song Fu were: One: Jonathan Coulton, Two: The RiffTones (from RiffTrax), Three: Molly Lewis, Four: Berg & Jerry, Five: Joe Covenant Lamb, Six: Mike Lombardo. Some other notable former Song Fu competitors include; Paul and Storm, Garfunkel and Oates and Neil Innes who wrote what he subtitled 'Ron Nasty's Last Song for the competition. There were also two Song Fu 'Specials': The Holiday Special, for which Paul and Storm wrote an exclusive track, and the Red Nose Day Special.

In 2010, Bagged & Boarded became a live show at Kevin Smith's SModCastle.

== Featured content ==
=== Podcasts ===
- Ken P.D. Snydecast - w/ Dana Snyder and Ken Plume
- Cabin Fever - w/ Aaron Poole and Brian Fitzpatrick
- Monkey Talk - w/ Paul Dini and Rashy
- Bagged & Boarded- w/ Matt Cohen and Jesse Rivers
- A Bit Of A Chat - w/ Ken Plume and various celebrities

=== Columns ===
- Opinion in a Haystack - by Bob Rose
- Thingamabobs - by Ken Plume
- Toy Box - by Michael Crawford
- Trailer Park - by Christopher Stipp
- TV or Not TV - by Will Willkins
- Game On! - by Ian Bonds
- Comics & Comics - by Matt Cohen
- Comics in Context - by Peter Sanderson
- Musical Myspace Tour- by Aaron Poole
- Party Favors - by Joe Corey
- Hands Down

=== Defunct columns ===
- About Town - by Thom Fowler (2002–2004)
- Off the Radar - by Thom Fowler (2002–2004)
