= Ain't It Cool News =

Website about film and television reviews and comic books

- Ain't It Cool News home page
- Website type: Film review, television review, comic books
- Available in: English
- Owners: Harry Knowles and Ain't It Cool, Inc.
- Creator: Harry Knowles
- Website: aintitcool.com
- Launched: April 1996; 30 years ago
- Current status: active

Ain't It Cool News (AICN) is an entertainment news website founded by Harry Knowles in 1996; it has been run by his sister Dannie Knowles since September 2017. The site is dedicated to news, rumors, and reviews of upcoming and current films, television, and comic book projects, with an emphasis on science fiction, superhero, fantasy, horror, and action genres.

== History ==
Ain't It Cool News was launched in 1996, and its name is attributed to a quote from John Travolta's character in the film Broken Arrow. Knowles began surfing the internet while recovering from a debilitating accident in 1996. He spent a lot of time in newsgroups exchanging gossip and rumors about upcoming films, eventually creating his own website as part of his internet hobby. A principal offering was Knowles' colorful movie reviews, but the primary distinction from other sites was the (ostensible) insider news articles. Production assistants, people in the industry, secretaries, and other behind-the-scenes folk would submit news such as casting decisions, scripts, and release dates, though Knowles himself has admitted that in the beginning, some of the articles from these alleged "spies" were his own work generated from scouring the newsgroups.

Over the next few years the site expanded by adding associate contributors across the globe, most of whom would go by pseudonyms, such as Elston Gunn; Chicago movie critic Steve Prokopy, who goes by the name "Capone" on AICN; Eric Vespe ("Quint"); Moises Chiullan ("Monty Cristo"); UK-based critic Adam Stephen Kelly ("Britgeek"); and Barbara Kennedy.

The website garnered national attention in 1997 with the release of Batman & Robin. Knowles posted several negative reviews from preview screenings. When the film performed poorly at the box office, studio executives complained that it had been sabotaged by the leaks to the Internet. However, negative reviews from other, more traditional, media confirmed what Knowles had posted. From there, the site's popularity rapidly expanded. National magazines such as People and Newsweek called for interviews with Knowles.

The site was parodied in the film Jay and Silent Bob Strike Back when the lead characters look at the Movie Poop Shoot site. That site was created at MoviePoopShoot.com as part of the film's publicity, and existed as a similar site for some time. However, after the release of Clerks II, the site was shut down. A site has since been put back up at that same URL, now run by Quick Stop Entertainment, a company probably best known for running the semi-official site for the TV series Scrubs and the official sites for the other films by Jay and Silent Bob Strike Back writer/director Kevin Smith.

Occasionally, filmmakers interact with fans on the site. Sylvester Stallone answered numerous questions from fans in the site's message boards while publicizing the release of Rocky Balboa as well as The Expendables. Bruce Willis also posted on the website briefly to promote his film Live Free or Die Hard.

On April 5, 2012, the first episode of Ain't It Cool with Harry Knowles was posted on YouTube. This scripted film news show, presented by Harry Knowles, is intended "to translate the fantasy-esque world of Ain't It Cool News to a different medium". In this episode, Knowles reviewed what he claimed to be the script for Ridley Scott's highly anticipated film Prometheus; however, screenwriter Damon Lindelof announced that Knowles must have been "duped", as the script was a fake that had been posted on the Internet almost a month before. Knowles then updated the story on the site and attempted an explanation.

== Decline of AICN in popularity ==
According to an April 5, 2013 article in The Hollywood Reporter, Knowles' site made $700,000 per year in revenue in its early 2000s prime. By 2013, traffic had dwindled and ad revenue had dropped to the low six figures. The Hollywood Reporter also noted that Knowles owed $300,000 in back taxes to the U.S. Internal Revenue Service by that point, and the inability of AICN to adapt beyond a dated 1990s web template, being outpaced by newer sites, and its continuing difficulty generating the scoops and headlines it was known for in its prime.

== Sexual assault allegations against Harry Knowles ==
On September 23, 2017, it was reported on IndieWire and circulated in other national media that Knowles had allegedly sexually assaulted a woman named Jasmine Baker on two occasions in 1999 and 2000 at official Alamo Drafthouse events in Austin, Texas, and that when informed of the incidents by Baker, Drafthouse owners took no action. Knowles denied the allegations.

In response to the story, a number of Ain't It Cool News contributors resigned from the site. Blogger Horrorella announced her departure on September 24. Longtime writers Steve Prokopy, who used the pseudonym "Capone," and Eric Vespe, who as "Quint," had been with the site since its beginnings, announced that they were leaving AICN. Alamo Drafthouse owner Tim League announced that the company, whose theater had served as home to the annual Butt-Numb-a-Thon film fest Knowles organized to commemorate his own birthday, had severed all ties with Knowles as a result of the controversy, and the Austin Film Critics Association voted to remove Knowles as a member of the group.

By September 26, four more women had made accusations of sexual assault and harassment. Knowles announced that he was stepping down from the site for "therapy, detox, and getting to a better place." He placed his sister, Dannie, who used the moniker "Pekosa Peligrosa," in control, and suggested that he was training her to run the site. Dannie herself started posting September 26, claiming a period of "female control" and intimating that there would be more female-accessible content for the foreseeable future.
