= I'm with Busey =

American television series

- Genre: Mockumentary
- Created by: Adam de la Peña
- Written by: Vito Viscomi
- Directed by: Sam Seder
- Starring: Gary Busey; Adam de la Peña
- Country of origin: United States
- Original language: English
- No. of seasons: 1
- No. of episodes: 13

Production
- Camera setup: Single-camera
- Running time: 30 minutes

Original release
- Network: Comedy Central
- Release: June 17 – August 5, 2003

I'm with Busey is a mockumentary television show which aired on Comedy Central in mid 2003. It revolved around a young writer named Adam de la Peña, who met and befriended his childhood idol, actor Gary Busey.

Only one season was produced and had limited popularity, but in the years after its cancellation it developed a cult following.

== Format ==
The show focuses on Gary Busey teaching Adam de la Peña about life. In one episode, for example, de la Peña complained to Busey about his lack of a love life. Busey helped him become more confident by setting him up with a date and then feeding him lines through an earpiece. Busey told him to tell the girl that he had "a Loch Ness monster in his pants".

Much of the humor revolves around Busey-isms, short statements about the world. For example: "Fear is the dark room where the devil develops his negatives." After such a phrase, the camera cuts to de la Peña's confused reaction, or to one of his short, confessional-style monologues. Many of these Busey-isms were later repeated during Busey's appearances on VH1's Celebrity Fit Club.

The show appears as real as possible. However, it was later revealed that much of the show was improvisation. Busey and de la Peña agreed on a scene's contents, and then improvised their lines.

== Episodes ==
Each episode has a topic of Adam's or Gary's choosing.

Episode list
#	Title	Synopsis
1	Pilot	Gary teaches Adam about what makes a man. Activities include Gary dressing as a woman in order to teach Adam about the feminine side of men, stating that "all men are failed women at birth."
2	Vision Quest	Gary teaches Adam how to survive in the desert by taking him on a journey to meet "The Magic Indian." Activities include Gary destroying Adam's camping equipment and forcing him to spend the night in the open in front of a campfire.
3	Fear	Gary tries to help Adam overcome his various fears. Activities include Gary forcing Adam, who doesn't drive, to participate in an automobile demolition derby.
4	Technology	Gary teaches Adam about the destructive potential of various forms of technology, (such as cameras and cordless phones) while Adam tries to show Gary the positive side of technology. Activities include the duo constructing remote-controlled robots and battling them against each other.
5	Imagination	Gary attempts to unlock the power of Adam's imagination. Activities include the duo pitching an idea from Gary's imagination—a roadkill cookbook—to a publishing agent.
6	Romance	Gary tries to help Adam with his love life. Activities include Gary tracking and advising Adam on a blind date.
7	Protection	Gary tries to show Adam how to protect himself. Activities include Gary forcing Adam to accompany him while he demonstrates protective driving.
8	Mystery	Gary and Adam investigate various mysteries, such as UFOs and bigfoot. Activities include Gary sniffing a man in an airport restaurant in order to determine whether or not he is an alien replicant.
9	Acting	In response to Adam's desire to learn how to be a movie star, Gary attempts to teach him about acting. Activities include Gary and Adam improvising a scene at an audition for a play instead of the scripted scene they are expected to perform.
10	Learning and Knowledge	Gary tries to teach Adam to learn life lessons rather than relying on academic knowledge. Activities include Gary forcing Adam to serve as a fry cook at a restaurant as a form of on-the-job training while he takes orders from the customers.
11	Environment	Gary teaches Adam about the importance of the environment. Activities include Gary cooking a dead badger found by the side of a road on a grill he scavenged from a garbage dump.
12	Trust	Gary tries to teach Adam about trust. Activities include Gary forcing Adam to climb to the top of an eagle perch and jump off to reach for a trapeze swing, while he controls the harness.
13	Break Up	Andy Dick encounters the duo at a video store and tries to convince Adam to allow him to supplant Busey as the star of the show. Activities include Adam and Andy going on a shopping spree.

== Reception ==
Variety's Phil Gallo described I'm with Busey ”as low grade as television will allow.”
