= Adam de la Peña =

American actor

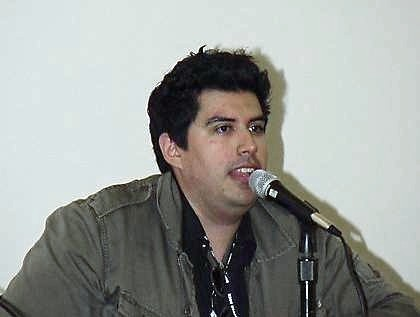
- Adam de la Peña at the San Diego Comic Con's Code Monkeys panel
- Occupation(s): Television actor, screenwriter, producer
- Years active: 2003–present

Adam de la Peña is an American actor, comedy writer, producer, and director.

== Career ==
De la Peña started his career writing for The Man Show. From there he continued to work with Jimmy Kimmel's Jackhole Productions, writing for Crank Yankers, and Jimmy Kimmel Live!. In 2003, De la Peña created and co-starred in a reality show, Comedy Central's I'm with Busey, in which he documented days in the life of his childhood idol, actor Gary Busey. The show aired for one season.

In 2006, De la Peña co-created, wrote, directed, and voiced characters for the Cartoon Network/Adult Swim cartoon Minoriteam. The show ran for 20 episodes. The following year Code Monkeys was brought to life on G4. De la Peña provided the voice of Dave on Code Monkeys and directed both seasons. He also joined the writing team for the live action film Bratz: The Movie for the Bratz franchise. Code Monkeys, which had two successful seasons, was not renewed with G4.

Continuing with animated projects, De la Peña moved to an Internet-based project called On the Bubble. The series of 19 two- to three-minute episodes was released online at their website as well as through YouTube, Vimeo, and other public video networks. For each character, social networking profiles were set up on Facebook, Twitter, and Bebo. The project ceased in 2009.

On November 9, 2011, his animated series Your Dungeon, My Dragon premiered on Xbox Live, MSN and YouTube.com.

On August 6, 2013, Geek & Sundry announced their collaboration and subsequent release of the series Outlands.
