= Andy Sipes =

American actor

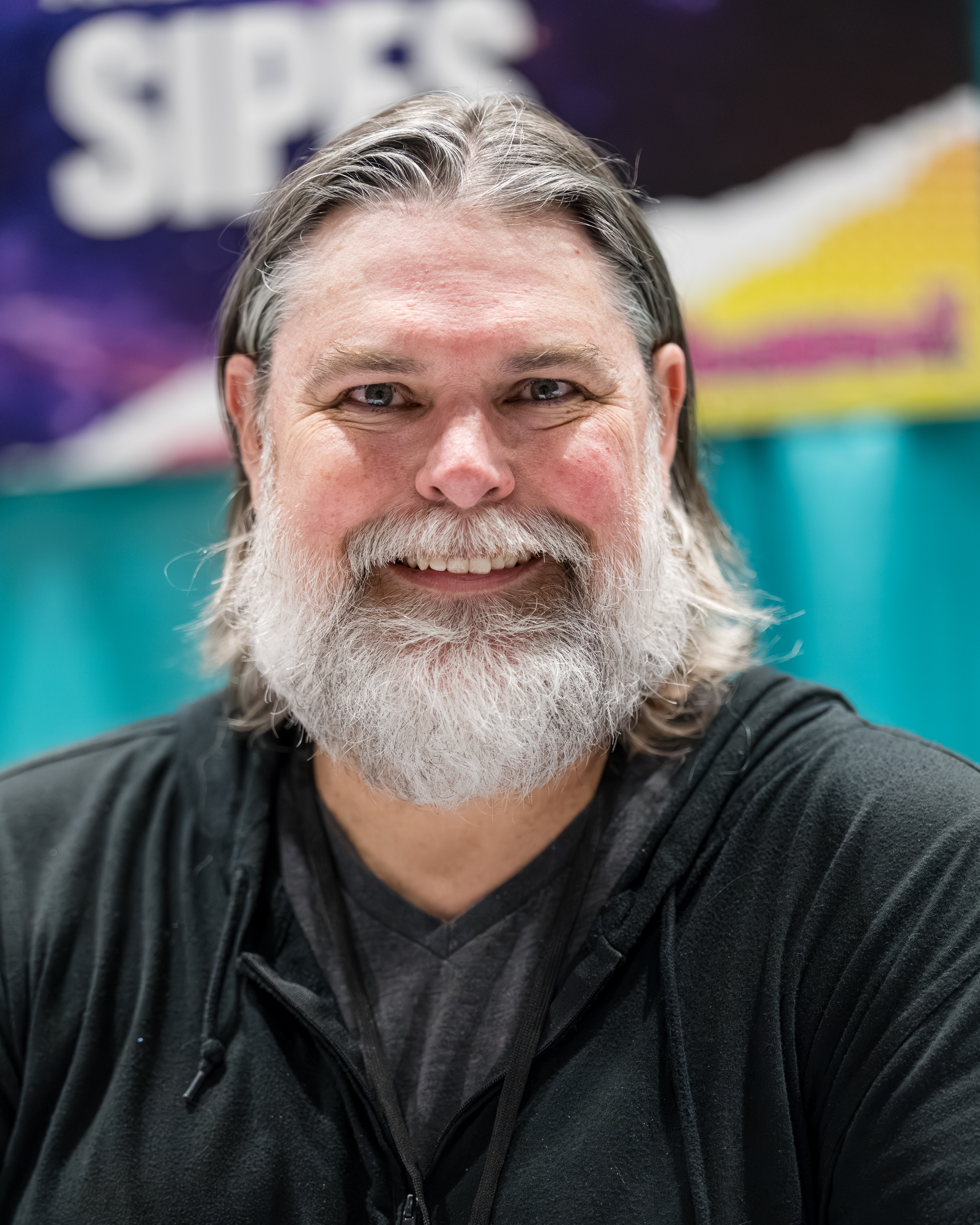
- Sipes at GalaxyCon Oklahoma City in 2026
- Born: July 2, 1975 (age 51); Oklahoma City, Oklahoma, U.S.
- Occupations: Writer; actor; art director
- Years active: 2002–present
- Height: 6 ft 7 in (201 cm)
- Spouse: Rachael Sipes

Andy Sipes (sometimes credited as Andrew Sipes) is a writer, actor, editor, producer, and art director.

== Career ==
Andy Sipes is an editor and actor, known for Dallas & Robo (2018), Supercon (2018), and Code Monkeys (2007). As an actor, his voice can be heard on the G4 animated series Code Monkeys as the insane Texan Mr. Larrity, as well as Mr. Larrity's idiotic son, Dean. He played a number of different characters on Adult Swim's Minoriteam, including Larry Bird. Andy can be seen playing Stromulus Guandor, Birdbat Leader (voiced by Carlos Alazraqui), on the Adult Swim series Saul of the Mole Men. From 2006 to 2008 he made appearances on NBC's Last Call with Carson Daly, usually playing a crude slob or one of Carson Daly's buddies. Sipes provided multiple voices on TripTank, a show he also wrote, produced, and directed.

As editor Sipes has worked on the FX series Archer, Chozen, Unsupervised, and Minoriteam. In 2018, along with Dana Snyder, Sipes wrote the Sony Pictures film Supercon. Previously Snyder and Sipes had worked together to create two Adult Swim web series, Sipes Stories and Songs For Helping. Andy Sipes was the executive producer of the 2018 YouTube series Dallas & Robo. The show was listed as one of the "10 Best Short-Lived Shows Of The Decade" by Forbes.com.

== Filmography ==
=== Film ===
| Year | Title | Role | Credit |
|---|---|---|---|
| 2004 | Soul Plane | | Art department assistant, production assistant |
| 2018 | Supercon | Hector The Room Service Guy | Writer |

=== Television ===
| Year | Title | Role | Credit |
|---|---|---|---|
| 2002 | Crank Yankers | | Associate producer |
| 2006 | Minoriteam | Rick, Dick, Larry Bird | |
| 2007 | Saul of the Mole Men | Stromulus | |
| 2007 | Code Monkeys | Larrity, Steve Jobs, Sergeant Murder | Art director, character designer |
| 2009 | DJ & the Fro | | Editor |
| 2010 | Archer | | Editor |
| 2011 | Your Dungeon, My Dragon | | Consulting producer |
| 2012 | Unsupervised | | Editor |
| 2014 | TripTank | Andy, Bill Pizza Dad | Editor |
| 2014 | Chozen | | Editor |
| 2016 | Kino-Edwards Picture Show | Phil Dietrickson | |

=== Web ===
| Year | Title | Role | Credit |
|---|---|---|---|
| 2010 | Sipes Stories | | Co-creator, writer |
| 2011 | Songs For Helping | | Co-creator, writer |
| 2018 | Dallas & Robo | | Developer, writer |
