= Kenneth Plume =

American writer and broadcaster (born 1977)

Ken Plume
- Plume at DragonCon in 2026
- Born: July 10, 1977 (age 49); Camp Lejeune, North Carolina, United States
- Occupations: Author, broadcaster, website owner
- Years active: 1998–present
- Notable work: Fred Entertainment, There's a Zombie in My Treehouse!, Milius
- Website: asitecalledfred.com

Kenneth "Plumey" Plume (born July 10, 1977) is an American author, broadcaster, film producer and owner of Fred Entertainment.

== Published works ==
Plume (with John Robinson) wrote the book There's a Zombie in My Treehouse! and paid out of pocket to have it published.

The book was announced at the Film Fest and on the Apocalypse Rising track at DragonCon in 2008. The book was paid by Plume to be published by Lulu Inc. the same year. The book details the story of a boy named Johnny who finds a zombie living in his backyard tree house and does not know what to do.

== Website and podcasts ==
Plume runs Fred Entertainment (www.ASiteCalledFRED.com), where he hosts the interview series A Bit of a Chat with Ken Plume. He also produced Kevin Smith and Scott Mosier's SModcast and co-hosts both the Ken P.D. Snydecast (with Dana Snyder) and Whotininnies (with Glen Oliver).

== Notable interview subjects ==
Plume has conducted many in depth interviews both in print and in various audio forms. His interview series A Bit of a Chat (which is distributed as a podcast) has included Dom Joly, Neil Innes, Stephen Colbert, Ernest Borgnine, Jonathan Coulton, Adam Savage, Paul F. Tompkins, John Hodgman and Ricky Gervais as well as many cast members and writers of the TV show Community including Gillian Jacobs, Megan Ganz and Jim Rash. Plume has also conducted print interviews for IGN with subjects such as Ian McKellen, Brian Henson and Stan Lee.

== Other works ==
Kenneth Plume acted as producer on the film Milius, a documentary about director and screenwriter John Milius. The film was screened on March 9, 2013, at the SXSW Film Festival.

In addition to the podcasts on his site, Plume produces the "SModimations" cartoon series based on Kevin Smith's SModcast.

Plume edited all five volumes of artist Steve Troop's Melonpool books:

- The Ultimate Melonpool: A Collection of Comics ISBN 0-9672306-0-8
- Melonpool II: The Voyage Home ISBN 0-9672306-1-6
- Melonpool III: A New Hope ISBN 0-9672306-2-4
- Melonpool IV: Castaway ISBN 0-9672306-3-2
- Melonpool V: This Island Earth ISBN 0-9672306-4-0

Plume was influential in bringing Red Nose Day to the United States with Red Nose Net. Red Nose Net, while not affiliated directly with Comic Relief, has hosted 24-hour marathon broadcasts with all donations made directly to Comic Relief. Plume was featured in the Jonathan Coulton and Paul and Storm written Red Nose charity single "Some Kind of Charity".

Plume also provided voices on the second-season finale of The Venture Bros.

== Awards and honors ==
Plume was one of 52 people chosen for Len Peralta's art project Geek a Week along with notables such as "Weird Al" Yankovic and Stan Lee.

He was nominated for a Shorty Award in 2010.
