= TripTank =

Television series

- Genre: Sketch comedy Adult animation
- Created by: Various
- Starring: Various
- Composers: Mark Rivers; Pendulum Music:Ryan Franks; Scott Nickoley
- Country of origin: United States
- Original language: English
- No. of seasons: 2
- No. of episodes: 28

Production
- Executive producers: Tom Gianas; Alex Bulkley; Corey Campodonico
- Producers: Jed Hathaway; Scout Raskin
- Editors: Matt Mariska; Robby DeFrain (season 1); Garret Elkins (season 1); Andy Sipes (season 2)
- Running time: 22 minutes
- Production companies: ShadowMachine; Comedy Partners

Original release
- Network: Comedy Central
- Release: April 2, 2014 – August 23, 2016

Related
- Jeff & Some Aliens

TripTank is an American adult animated sketch comedy television series which premiered April 2, 2014 on Comedy Central. The show is made up of various sketches, portrayed by multiple animation styles created by many different animators and writers. Although no direct correlation exists between the different stories, a continued theme of dark satire prevails throughout.

Voicing talent includes Carlos Alazraqui, Bill Oakley, Wayne Brady, Bob Odenkirk, Curtis Armstrong, Nat Faxon, Tom Kenny, Aries Spears, Rachel Butera, Larry David, Yotam Perel, Rob Yulfo, Zach Galifianakis, Kumail Nanjiani, Brett Gelman, Kyle Kinane, John DiMaggio, Duncan Trussell, Joey Diaz, Niecy Nash, among others.

On July 18, 2016, the series was cancelled after two seasons.

== Recurring sketches ==
Several sketch characters and scenarios recur within the series sometimes interspersed throughout the same episode or only once per episode. These include:

- TripTank Reception – A show starring receptionist Ben (Ben Wolfinsohn) in season 1, and Ben's replacement Steve (Jonah Ray) in season two, and the janitor Roy W. Winchester (Eric Magnussen) who sulks around the lobby. The scenes are normally of Ben or Steven receiving calls from random people who watched the show, either to praise the show or express distaste for the content. After listening, Steve puts the caller on hold while he "transfers them to that department". There are also segments where Roy talks Steve into doing things that he normally wouldn't by himself.
- Versus – A show hosted by Death, in which two groups of unfairly matched combatants are pitted against each other in a fight to the death.
- Jeff & Some Aliens – A trio of aliens (all voiced by Alessandro Minoli) come to Earth and invade the personal space of Jeff (Brett Gelman), who they consider to be the most average man on Earth. It is later revealed that their analysis on Jeff is part of their mission to judge humanity to see if it is worthy of survival or extermination by the aliens' overlords. These series of sketches would later spawn a separate spin-off series of half-hour episodes, which premiered on January 11, 2017.
- Suicidal Attention Whore Chicken – A chicken (Tom Kenny) gets people to do whatever he wants by making suicide threats. He publicly threatens to commit suicide for many reasons that range from gaining publicity, to making himself happier, to just downright pissing people off.
- Dick Genie – A show about a nerdy teenage boy named Billy (Yuri Lowenthal) who has a magical Dick Genie (Kumail Nanjiani) that he is able to summon by masturbating. Dick Genie grants all of Billy's wishes based upon his perverted sexual fantasies. However, when he does this, his wishes always backfire on him and it's not always easy for him to undo his wish.
- Suck It Gary! – Three guys (Dana Snyder, Andy Sipes, Matt Mariska) go out of their way and do horrible things to pull "friendly" pranks on a guy named Gary (Paul Reiser). Despite Gary being nice to them, the three guys hate him to the point they blame him for their misfortunes and basically attempt to ruin his life so they can tell him to "suck it".
- 4:20 – Normally short, even by the show's standards, it shows various people going through seemingly serious situations until they are asked what time it is. A three-eyed hippie (Felix Colgrave) answers with "4:20", to which the other characters respond "Nice!" and proceed to get high on cannabis.
- Bethiffer – A series of sketches about an fat, selfish teenage girl, Bethany (Nick Swardson), and her friend Jennifer, whom she bullies (Ashley Fink), who have misadventures in a shopping mall.
- Flower Teen Kill Team Go! – A series of sketches with an anime style about a team of four Japanese girls who are also hitmen consisting of Sada (Tammy Nishimura), Nari (Miley Yamamoto), Michiko (Niki Yang) and Rin (not voiced) who were sent to Tamaulipas to take over the local drug cartels under the guise of transfer students. They also deal with the usual struggles of high school including driver's education and dating.
- Ricky the Rocketship – A series of sketches about an anthropomorphic rocket named Ricky (Tom Kenny) whose attempts to help children with their problems ends with him unintentionally killing them and other people.
- Jerk Chicken – A chicken (Dana Snyder) provokes people with his annoying personality and insults.
- Animal Hitman – A series of sketches of a man in a suit walking up in the rain, then shooting various animals. The sketches always end with a cheesy one-liner from the hitman.
- Gusto Rules – An egg leader named Gusto (Dana Snyder) gives speeches to his fellow egg citizens.
- The Last Dead Unicorn – A unicorn gets killed in various violent ways, à la Happy Tree Friends.

== Episodes ==
=== Series overview ===
Season	Episodes	Originally aired	
Season	Episodes	First aired	Last aired
1	8	April 2, 2014	May 21, 2014
2	20	September 25, 2015	August 23, 2016

=== Season 1 (2014) ===
No. overall	No. in season	Title	Original release date
1	1	"Shovels Are for Digging"	April 2, 2014
Ricky the Rocketship takes some friends to the moon, a paranoid and delusional homeless man hosts a talk show, and "the birds and the bees" talk gets an update.
2	2	"Crossing the Line"	April 9, 2014
A drunk hobo faces off against six gorillas, a group of friends plots revenge on Gary, and Mr. There's Got To Be A Better Way tries to solve world hunger.
3	3	"Game Over"	April 16, 2014
A man falls in love with an artificial vagina, Roy becomes obsessed with a video game, and a cult leader struggles to keep his followers interested in his revelations.
4	4	"The Green"	April 23, 2014
A third grade soccer team takes on the Mongolian horde, the aliens help Jeff through a breakup, and Jesus makes a terrible mistake.
5	5	"Ahhh, Serenity"	April 30, 2014
A spokesman hawks a device that allows women to pee silently, a trucker has a life-changing experience while on mushrooms, and Billy meets the Dick Genie.
6	6	"Candy Van Finger Bang"	May 7, 2014
A Chinese man looks for an American mail-order bride, two piñatas come to a terrifying realization, & Bethiffer goes shopping for lingerie.
7	7	"Roy & Ben's Day Off"	May 14, 2014
Larry David has lunch with Larry Flynt, an "Animal Hitman" takes out various pets, and Gary's day out playing mini-golf with his son is interrupted by pranks on "Suck It, Gary."
8	8	"XXX Overload"	May 21, 2014
Jeff must find someone to have sex with to prevent aliens from destroying the planet, a doctor performs magic tricks while delivering babies, and Bethiffer tries out a virtual reality video game.

=== Season 2 (2015–16) ===
No. overall	No. in season	Title	Original release date
9	1	"The W.A.N.G."	September 25, 2015
Garden gnomes take revenge against their owner; Animal Hitman takes out more targets; Gary gets pranked at the doctor's office.
10	2	"Let Me Transfer You"	October 2, 2015
A car salesman will do almost anything to sell cars; Gary is pranked during a Boy Scouts campout; a gun-toting homeowner confronts the Easter Bunny.
11	3	"Dirty Talk"	October 9, 2015
Receptionist Steve keeps getting aroused at work; Jeff has to prevent Chad from getting Linda pregnant with a future evil dictator; a lizard fights a robotic scorpion.
12	4	"Cold War 2"	October 16, 2015
A 30-year-old man living inside his mother's womb needs a shave; a cute hamster faces a killer robotic wasp on "Versus," Roy and Steve conspire against the Russian military.
13	5	"Short Change"	October 23, 2015
Jerk Chicken has a happy ending at a massage parlor; a group of ghosts spy on a naked woman; the Suck It, Gary! guys tell a bedtime story set in medieval times.
14	6	"Hot Box"	October 30, 2015
Bethiffer gets a job as a mall security guard; Jerk Chicken causes a scene at a local bar; Ricky the Rocketship inadvertently ruins a school play.
15	7	"Cereal Interruptus"	November 6, 2015
A cheesy stand-up comic performs at a bachelor party; a demonic spirit possesses a sex doll; Italian mobsters bring a dead body to the dry cleaner.
16	8	"Precipice of Yesterday"	November 13, 2015
A football coach attempts to give a halftime speech; the aliens get addicted to the smell of Jeff's farts on Jeff & Some Aliens; a sniper tries to take out receptionist Steve.
17	9	"Mr. Winchester Goes to Washington"	November 20, 2015
Forest creatures accuse a princess of being a tease; Ricky the Rocketship rescues kids & takes them to a dangerous forest; Animal Hitman carries out more hits; the "TripTank" staff are forced to testify in front of Congress.
18	10	"Steve's Family"	November 27, 2015
Santa goes into diabetic shock; Gary is pranked at his holiday party; a girl meets her boyfriend's Juggalo parents.
19	11	"Crime Steve Investigation"	June 20, 2016
Bethiffer tracks down terrorists at the mall; the aliens use a sound machine with unintended consequences on Jeff and some aliens; the "Suck It, Gary!" guys prank Gary at a water park.
20	12	"How the Sausage Is Made"	June 27, 2016
Jerk Chicken goes on an afternoon outing; cowboys compete for the title of Smallest Dick in the West; Steve and Roy get stuck in a long restroom line.
21	13	"Sick Day"	July 4, 2016
A disgraced mayor holds a press conference in the middle of an insect apocalypse; a very loud ninja assassin carries out a mission; Animal Hitman struggles to take out a fly.
22	14	"TripTank 2025"	July 11, 2016
Stand-Up Dad's family doesn't like his "Rocko" character; another edition of "Pills, Pills, Pills"; the noble Sir Ian fights a warlock.
23	15	"#InsideRoy"	July 19, 2016
Bird poop bombards Gary; an angry boss demands his Oops All Berries cereal; Steve gets shrunken down in order to erase a memory from Roy's body.
24	16	"Brain Virus"	July 26, 2016
A Bond villain becomes a successful comic; a guy telling wife jokes responds angrily when the tables are turned; a clown battles a mime on Versus.
25	17	"Deuce Ex Machina"	August 2, 2016
Jeff takes a vacation to the aliens' home planet; a fairy godmother drinks; a woman uses her vagina as a purse.
26	18	"Buck Wild"	August 9, 2016
Jerk Chicken goes to a strip club; a group of forest animals make a dress for Cinderella; director Buck LaFontaine wreaks havoc at the TripTank offices.
27	19	"The D.O.N.G."	August 16, 2016
Sammy tries to make Jeff and Some Aliens into a hit TV show; Ricky the Rocketship tries to prevent a gang war; Chaz Sinclair throws a bachelor party at his hillside mansion.
28	20	"Green Out"	August 23, 2016
A kid participates in a role-playing game via webcam; immigrants' names get changed at Ellis Island; the guys try to prank Gary at the mall on "Suck It, Gary!"

== Reception ==
The first two episodes of TripTank were met with very mixed reviews, as The A.V. Club stated: "TripTank is a mixed bag by default. If the good stuff doesn't stick around long enough, the silver lining is that the stinkers and the duds don't last much longer".

General feeling among reviewers was of much the same mind, with some reviewers calling the show "rude and irreverent", while some noted that the better quality sketches were enough to overcome the failure of the negative sketches, and compared the show to Liquid Television.
