= Dana Snyder =

American actor (born 1973 or 1974)

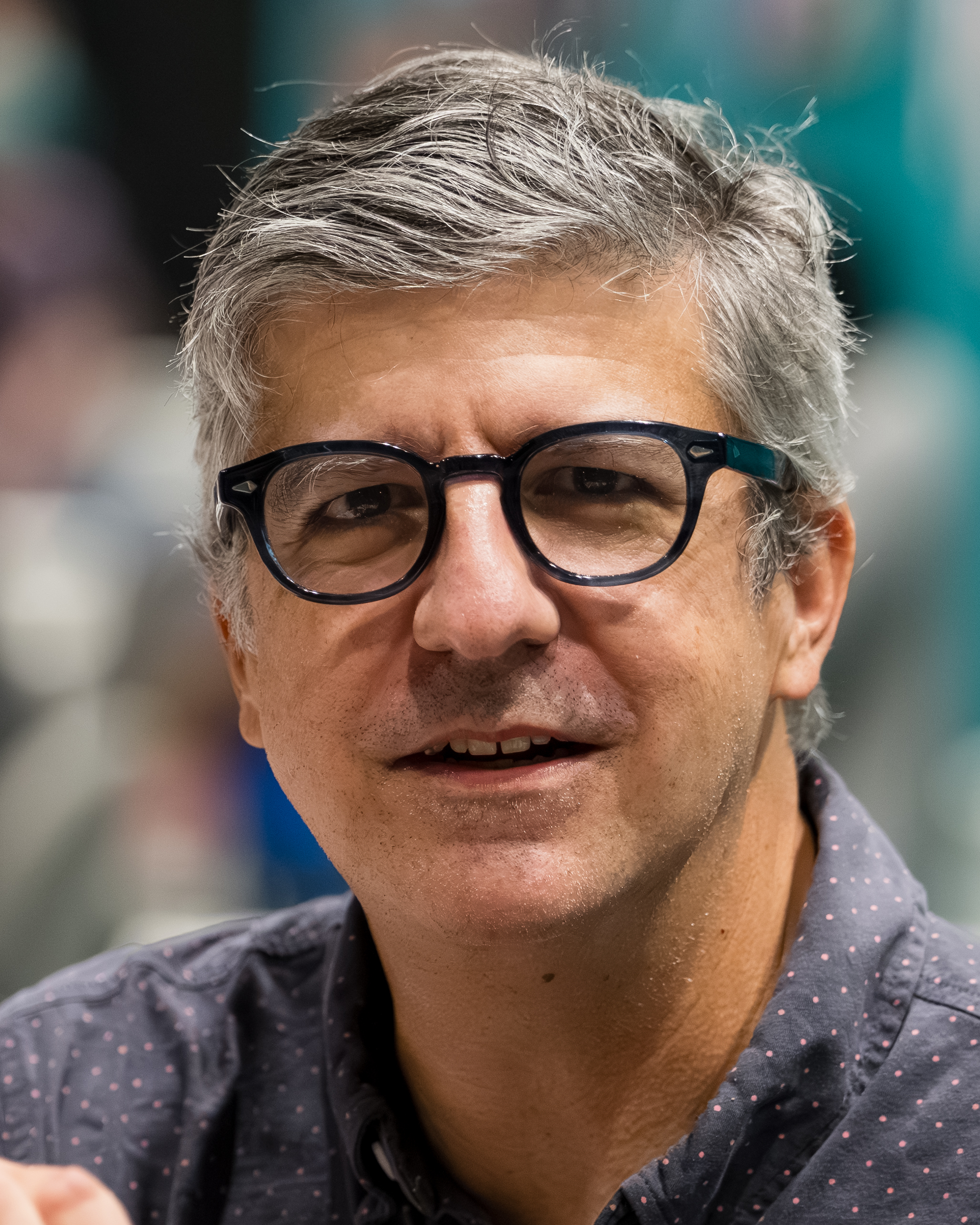
- Snyder at GalaxyCon Oklahoma City in 2026
- Born: 1973 or 1974 (age 52–53); Allentown, Pennsylvania, U.S.
- Other name: Carmine Decenzo
- Education: Las Vegas High School; Webster University (BFA)
- Occupations: Actor; comedian
- Years active: 2000–present
- Spouse: Christine Snyder (m. 2005)
- Children: 1

Dana Snyder (born c. November 14, 1973 or 1974) is an American actor and comedian. He is known for his voice roles of Master Shake in Aqua Teen Hunger Force, Granny Cuyler in Squidbillies, Baby Ball on Ballmastrz: 9009, and other roles in various Adult Swim television shows. Other voice roles include voicing Gazpacho in Cartoon Network's animated series Chowder, Dr. Colosso in Nickelodeon's comedy series The Thundermans, and Scratch in Disney Channel's animated series The Ghost and Molly McGee. His live-action work has been in television shows such as Saul of the Mole Men and Your Pretty Face Is Going to Hell.

== Early life and education ==
Snyder was born in Allentown, Pennsylvania, and grew up in Las Vegas, Nevada. He credits Don Rickles, Rip Taylor, and Phil Silvers as childhood influences in his decision to pursue acting. Snyder graduated from Las Vegas High School in 1992 and from Webster University in St. Louis in 1996 with a BFA from Webster's Conservatory of Theatre Arts.

== Career ==
=== Voice acting ===
Snyder was hired to voice Master Shake on Aqua Teen Hunger Force, auditioning over the phone in a call with Dave Willis, the show's co-creator. Snyder played the vocal role of Gazpacho on Chowder, Dr. Wang on Minoriteam, The Alchemist and The President on The Venture Bros., Baby Ball on Ballmastrz: 9009, and Granny Cuyler on Squidbillies. He voices Todd and Benny Lee on the G4TV show Code Monkeys, Leonard the Koala in The Penguins of Madagascar, and plays a teacher named "Mr. Baldwin" on the Disney series Fish Hooks.

He played Alistair in Open Season 3.

Snyder provided the voices of Sam and that of Cold Fusion Reactor Dad on the web series Suicide by Side. He narrated the Adult Swim web series Sipes Stories that he co-produced with Andy Sipes. He has starred on Adventure Time as the Ancient Sleeping Magi of Life Giving from the episode "Little Dude" in the fifth season. He played the voice of Belcitane within the White Knight Chronicles, and the White Knight Chronicles II. He also shows up in the web series "Bravest Warriors" in season 2 episode 6.

He voices the recurring character McSweats in the Disney XD animated series Pickle and Peanut. Snyder played Dr. Colosso on Nickelodeon's comedy The Thundermans from 2013 to 2018, voicing Colosso's rabbit form and portraying his human form. He also played as Graballa the Hutt on the Disney XD animated series Lego Star Wars: The Freemaker Adventures.

In 2021, Snyder appeared as Patrick Star's grandfather on The Patrick Star Show and in the role of Scratch the ghost on The Ghost and Molly McGee.

=== Stage acting ===
On April 15, 2010, Snyder and Dave Willis went on a multi-city tour called Aqua Teen Hunger Force Live!.

In June 2010, he appeared as Max Bialystock in the Arrow Rock Lyceum Theatre's production of Mel Brooks' The Producers in Arrow Rock, Missouri.

In February and March 2011, Snyder reprised his role as Max Bialystock in The Producers at the Riverside Theatre in Vero Beach, Florida. Snyder has also been seen in the Lyceum Theatre 2011 productions of Run For Your Wife, Damn Yankees, and The Sound of Music and has worked at several other United States regional theaters, including Repertory Theatre of St. Louis, Cincinnati Playhouse in the Park, and Cleveland Play House. Snyder was also a guest performer during several performances of the Atlanta-based burlesque revue "Dames Aflame" in 2010 and 2012.

=== Film and television ===
Snyder has made guest appearances on ER, Brothers and Sisters, and Gary Unmarried.

Snyder appeared in Saul of the Mole Men, The Young Person's Guide to History, and Your Pretty Face Is Going to Hell. He guest appeared on the Christian live action television show Come on Over.

=== Podcasts ===
Snyder co-hosted the Ken P.D. Snydecast with Kenneth Plume, which was a free podcast. The show debuted on January 11, 2006, and its last episode was September 18, 2017. The show was produced out of IGN and then out of Fred Entertainment prior to its finale in 2017. In addition to Snyder and Plume, guests have included Doc Hammer, Paul Sabourin, and Jay Wade Edwards.

In late 2013, Dana began co-hosting the podcast Drunk on Disney with Guy Hutchinson. Since 2018, Snyder started hosting Dino and Dana's Safe Space Starring Spencer and Tish with Dino Stamatopoulos, Spencer Crittenden, and Tish Burns. Occasional guests include Jeff B. Davis and Cassandra Church.

As of January 2021, Dino and Dana's Safe Space no longer stars Spencer or Tish and exclusively streams on Patreon. Podcast regulars now include comedian Lisa Corrao and Bob and Ron of Chicago's Bob and Ron's Record Club.

In February 2025, Snyder began co-hosting the podcast None of This Matters with rapper and voice actor MC Chris. The weekly comedy podcast features the former Aqua Teen Hunger Force castmates engaging in informal conversations over breakfast about pop culture and their creative careers.

== Filmography ==
=== Film ===
List of voice performances in feature films
Year	Title	Role	Notes
2007	Dante's Inferno	Ulysses, Strom Thurmond	
2007	Aqua Teen Hunger Force Colon Movie Film for Theaters	Master Shake	
2010	Open Season 3	Alistair	
2011	A Letter to Momo	Kawa	English dub
2015	Batman Unlimited: Animal Instincts	The Penguin	Direct-to-video
2015	Hell and Back	Garthog	
2016	Nerdland	Confused Guy	
2016	Batman Unlimited: Mechs vs. Mutants	The Penguin, Buzz	Direct-to-video film
2018	Scooby-Doo! and the Gourmet Ghost	Skip Taylor	Direct-to-video film
2022	Aqua Teen Forever: Plantasm	Master Shake	Direct-to-video film
2023	The Venture Bros.: Radiant Is the Blood of the Baboon Heart	The Alchemist	Direct-to-video film
2023	Urkel Saves Santa: the Movie	Mr. Kalan, Bus Dispatch	Direct-to-video film
2024	The Thundermans Return	Dr. Colosso	
2026	Clash of the Thundermans	Dr. Colosso	

=== Television ===
List of voice performances in television shows
Year	Title	Role	Notes
2000–2023	Aqua Teen Hunger Force	Master Shake	Main role
2001	Sealab 2021	Master Shake	Episode: "Murphy Murph & the Feng Shui Bunch"
2005–2021	Squidbillies	Granny Cuyler	Main role
2005–2006	Minoriteam	Dr. Wang	Recurring role
2006	Robot Chicken	Master Shake, various voices	4 episodes
2006–2007	Come On Over	Dr. FullOvit	3 episodes
2006–2018	The Venture Bros.	The Alchemist, President Breyer, Dog-Man, Mr. Sample, Bonizobo Tribesman, Parade Announcer	Recurring role
2007–2008	Code Monkeys	Todd, Benny	24 episodes
2007–2010	Chowder	Gazpacho, various voices	48 episodes
2010	The Marvelous Misadventures of Flapjack	Herman, various voices	3 episodes
2010	The Cartoonstitute	Danger Planet	Episode: "Danger Planet"
2010	Robotomy	Dreadnot, Thunderbyte	10 episodes
2010–2013	Mad	Various voices	29 episodes
2010–2011	The Penguins of Madagascar	Leonard	4 episodes
2010–2014	Fish Hooks	Mr. Baldwin, Bud, Clamantha's Mom	31 episodes
2012	Superjail!	Prison Pee Dee	5 episodes
2013–2018	Adventure Time	Ancient Sleeping Magi of Life Giving	5 episodes
2013, 2015	Bob's Burgers	Pud, Sheldon	2 episodes
2013–2018	The Thundermans	Dr. Colosso	Main role
2014	The Haunted Hathaways	Dr. Colosso	Episode: "The Haunted Thundermans"
2014	Bravest Warriors	The Thing, Puppet Characters	Episode: "The Puppetyville Horror"
2014	Creature Commandos	Warren Griffith	Shorts
2014–2015	Turbo Fast	Buster Move	2 episodes
2014–2016	Triptank	Dana, Gene, various voices	21 episodes
2015	DC Super Friends	The Penguin	7 episodes
2015–2018	Pickle and Peanut	McSweats	9 episodes
2016	Lego Star Wars: The Freemaker Adventures	Graballa the Hutt	8 episodes
2016	Nicky, Ricky, Dicky & Dawn	Dr. Colosso	1 episode
2016	Harvey Beaks	Blargus	Episode: "Technoscare"
2016–2018	Justice League Action	Plastic Man, The Penguin	7 episodes
2017–2019	OK K.O.! Let's Be Heroes	Doctor Greyman, Elf King, Cough Man	7 episodes
2017–2019	Welcome to the Wayne	Wendell, Edward Hopper	Recurring role
2018–2020	Ballmastrz: 9009	Baby Ball	Main role
2018	Dallas & Robo	Fat Paul	Main role
2018–2022	Paradise PD	Stanley Hopson, Dusty Marlow	Recurring role (season 1); main role (seasons 2–4)
2018	12 oz. Mouse	Buzby	Episode: "Invictus"
2018	LEGO Star Wars: All-Stars	Graballa the Hutt	4 episodes
2019	Mao Mao: Heroes of Pure Heart	Medatatin' Melvin	Episode: "Flyaway"
2020	ThunderCats Roar	Vultureman, Berbils	18 episodes
2021–present	The Patrick Star Show	GrandPat Star	Main role
2021–2024	The Ghost and Molly McGee	Scratch	Main role
2021–2025	Jellystone!	Snagglepuss, Touché Turtle, Lambsy Divey, various voices	Recurring role
2021	Aquaman: King of Atlantis	Ocean Master, Robot Hands	Miniseries; voice role
2021	Cake	Cat	Recurring role
2021	Lego Star Wars: Terrifying Tales	Graballa the Hutt	Television special
2022	Farzar	Ficheal, Bazarath	Voice role
2022–present	Chibiverse	Scratch	Recurring role
2022–2023	Kamp Koral: SpongeBob's Under Years	GrandPat Star	2 episodes
2023	SpongeBob SquarePants	GrandPat Star	2 episodes
2024	Smiling Friends	Rotten the Snowman	Episode: "Pim Finally Turns Green"
2025-present	The Thundermans: Undercover	Dr. Colosso	Recurring role
2026	Cartoon Cartoons	Buttons T. Rat	Episode: "Buttons' Gamezone"
2026	Rock Paper Scissors	Bug	Episode: "Car Wash Nationals"
2026	Robot Chicken Adult Swim Special	Master Shake, Marquess of Queensberry	Television Special
2026 - present	Universal Basic Guys	Rhoda	Main role (season 3-)

=== Video games ===
List of voice performances in video games
Year	Title	Role
2007	Aqua Teen Hunger Force Zombie Ninja Pro-Am	Master Shake
2010	White Knight Chronicles	Belcitane
2012	Epic Mickey 2: The Power of Two	Gremlin Jamface
2023	Justice League: Cosmic Chaos	Mister Mxyzptlk
2025	Date Everything!	Vaughn Trapp, Smokonio

=== Live-action ===
List of acting performances in television shows
Year	Title	Role	Notes
2007	ER	Paranoid Man	Episode: "Lights Out"
2007	Brothers & Sisters	Office Worker	Episode: "Home Front"
2007	Saul of the Mole Men	Kiko, Strata Operator, Benjamin Franklin	20 episodes
2008	Young Person's Guide to History	Benjamin Franklin	Television special
2013–2019	Your Pretty Face Is Going to Hell	Lucas, Troy	13 episodes
2016	Gamer's Guide to Pretty Much Everything	Mr. Funkus	3 episodes

=== Other ===
Year	Title	Role	Notes
2007	Aqua Teen Hunger Force Colon Movie Film for Theaters	Master Shake	Writer, performer: "Nude Love", & Voice Actor
2009	G4 Presents Comic-Con '09 Live	Belcitane	Performer: "Nature's Bounty" and "Yellowcake"
2022	Nuzlocke but My Friends Control My Pokémon	Giratina	Voice Actor, Saltydkdan livestream, episode "and they all DIE", voice provided via soundboard
2022	Your Pretty Face is Going to Hell: The Cartoon	Troy Ersatz	Voice actor
2023	Star Trek: Very Short Treks	Bragu	Voice actor, episode: "Worst Contact"
2026	Cyanide & Happiness	Megaphone Man	Voice actor, episode: "The Life And Crimes Of Gunman"
