= Minoriteam =

American animated television series

- Genre: Superhero; Parody; Dark comedy
- Created by: Adam de la Peña; Peter Girardi; Todd James
- Written by: Adam de la Peña
- Directed by: Peter Girardi; Todd James; Adam de la Peña
- Voices of: Dana Snyder; Nick Puga; Rodney Saulsberry; Enn Reitel; Keith Lal; Todd James; Caroline Hu; Peter Girardi; Hope Moore; Adam de la Peña
- Composer: Todd Spahr
- Country of origin: United States
- Original language: English
- No. of episodes: 19 (and 1 pilot)

Production
- Executive producers: Todd James; Adam de la Peña; Peter Girardi
- Producers: Peter Girardi(pilot); Sandi Yi (series)
- Editor: Andy Sipes
- Running time: 11 minutes
- Production companies: Funny Garbage; Reas International; Monkey Wrangler Productions; Williams Street

Original release
- Network: Adult Swim
- Release: March 19 – July 23, 2006

Minoriteam is an American adult animated television series on Cartoon Network's late night programming block Adult Swim. It ran from 2005 to 2006, with a total of one season and 20 episodes. The show was not renewed for a second season and was cancelled. It continued to have a web presence on the Adult Swim website, with episodes streaming intermittently, until its removal on June 12, 2020, amidst racial justice protests in the United States.

== Plot ==
The plot of the show revolves around five superheroes, each of whom is based on a racial or ethnic stereotype, who join forces to fight against a bunch of villains who are mostly discriminatory concepts. The show's artwork is largely an homage to Jack Kirby ("King Kirby" is thanked in the show's end credits), while the animation style parodies the limited animation of The Marvel Super Heroes of 1966. The opening tag declaring that Minoriteam is broadcast "FULLY COLORED" is both a racial reference and an homage to the "IN COLOR" or "IN TECHNICOLOR" line opening many old cartoons.

== Characters ==
=== Minoriteam ===
- Dr. Wang, Chinese Human Calculator (voiced by Dana Snyder) – The leader of the Minoriteam. He is paraplegic. He has a terrible personality and powerful mental abilities gained from drinking his own urine. He also owns and operates a laundromat where he charges extra to get the customer's clothes back from the machines. In addition, he has faked accidents to obtain legal settlements and is a compulsive gambler. He has no known non-stereotypical character in real life. In the episode "The Assimilator", Dr. Wang gives the team "tea" to drink and then tells them that it is his urine. His depiction as Chinese, however, leans more to the stereotype of Northeast Chinese people, mostly with his mustache and queue, which otherwise makes his design reminiscent of Dr. Fu Manchu.
- El Jefe (voiced by Nick Puga) – El Jefe is an overweight, moustached Mexican who fights crime with the Leafblower 3000, the deadliest weapon in the entire universe. His mask is a Sombrero pulled halfway down his face with eye holes cut in it. In his non-stereotypical real life, Richard Escartin is the handsome billionaire CEO of his own oil company. El Jefe is also 1/18th Viking.
- Fasto (voiced by Rodney Saulsberry) – An African-American who is known as "the fastest man that ever was." In addition, he seems to have the power to seduce or charm all white women in the immediate area. Fasto wears a green mask, a T-shirt, cut-off jeans, striped tube socks, and sneakers. In his non-stereotypical real life, Landon K. Dutton is a bookish and bespectacled Professor of Women's Studies. He vigorously pursues sexual relationships with what he calls "booty" (especially white women) but is uninterested in an exclusive relationship. His father is a space-alien from the planet Blackton which was destroyed by Balactus.
- Jewcano (voiced by Enn Reitel) – A white-bearded, massively muscular man in a yarmulke (which he can throw like a deadly frisbee a la Wonder Woman's tiara) and a Star of David leotard with the powers of the Jewish faith and the fiery fury of an erupting volcano (after being knocked into a volcano accidentally by Dr. Wang). He is always screaming at the top of his lungs. In his non-stereotypical real life, wimpy young accountant Neil Horowitz dates Mika, Fasto's statuesque younger cousin, and loves soul food. Jewcano is also the member of Minoriteam who spends the most time in his civilian garb (or merely has his civilian garb shown on-screen more often than his teammates' garbs).
- Non-Stop (voiced by Keith Lal) – An Indian convenience store owner who is immune to bullets and fire because of his lead-lined skin. His non-stereotypical identity of Dave Raj is an ex-professional skateboarder, a talent that comes in handy when flying on his magic carpet. While not fighting crime, Dave sometimes smokes a hookah. He sometimes says "Krishna, give me strength!" when surprised and his magic word to transform into his bearded, bare-chested, turban-clad alter ego is "Abrakazoom!".

=== White Shadow Organization ===
The five heroes team up to fight characters who are mostly racial stereotypes, including a collective of villains comprising numerous, over-the-top Caucasian stereotypes. The White Shadow organization, the "evilest organization known to Man", is based in Corporate City. Its mission is to promote white supremacy and racism and oppress minorities.

The White Shadow Organization's most important members appear in almost every episode. They are:

- The White Shadow (voiced by Adam de la Peña) – The leader of this organization of supervillains which is named after him. He has a one-eyed golden helmet in the shape of the "Great Seal" pyramid on the U.S. one-dollar bill, which some have considered the Freemasonry/Illuminati Pyramid. Racist Frankenstein is also seen calling him Kevin, which might be his real name.
- The Corporate Ladder (voiced by Todd James) – A green-caped, pipe-smoking ladder with a stool at the top who is impossible to scale/climb (unless you're white and were born into a rich heritage). This mimics the beliefs of some who see corporations as difficult to scale for minorities. He frequently makes fun of White Shadow's leadership and often plots behind White Shadow's back. The Corporate Ladder has had gambling problems in the past and his life's goal was to become a minion. He was also responsible at one point for sending the White Shadow and several members of the organization to prison.
- Racist Frankenstein (voiced by Adam de la Peña) – "Body of a monster, the mind of a racist." Though his name is a direct reference to Frankenstein's monster, Racist Frankenstein is a closer parody of the depiction of Solomon Grundy from the Challenge of the Superfriends animated series, mocking Grundy's heavy southern accent, monstrous appearance and tendency to refer to himself in the third person with poor grammar. Dresses like the stereotype of a WASP, usually in a yuppy-style pink sweater. Racist Frankenstein hates Black people and even black-coloured objects. He is blond and has blue skin. Racist Frankenstein's catchphrase neatly summarizes his master strategy for fighting Minoriteam: "Racist Frankenstein hit Blacks with hands!"
- The Standardized Test (voiced by Peter Girardi) – A giant robot-like man with an eraser on his head and a costume patterned off a Scantron answer sheet. His form refers to the idea that standardized tests are biased against minorities. The Standardized Test speaks with a robotic, monotonous voice.

Secondary White Shadow Organization members featured in some episodes have included:

- Corporate Loophole – An anthropomorphic loop of rope who is the White Shadow Organization's lawyer. He is familiar with obscure legal 'loopholes' that allow the White Shadow organization to skirt the law.
- Dirty Cop (voiced by Dicky Barrett) – A steaming turd in a police uniform. Dirty Cop is a corrupt and often racist police officer.
- The Plant – A talking potted houseplant representing planted evidence who is usually seen working with Dirty Cop.
- Shamus McFisticuffs – A drunken leprechaun representing the stereotype of the violent and alcoholic Irish-American.
- Steven Skullbird – An eagle-sized bird with a skull head. Its name is a parody of Steven Spielberg (its evil intent is not specified).
- Middle-manager Tom Severson (voiced by Dana Snyder) – A nebbish, bespectacled, one-armed man portraying a stereotypical bureaucrat.
- Stuck Up Girlfriend (voiced by Hope Moore) – A pretty, white, blond, ignorant, spoiled, and arrogant young girl (reminiscent of Paris Hilton).

== Episodes ==
Season	Episodes	Originally released	
Season	Episodes	First released	Last released
Pilot	1	November 6, 2005	
1	19	March 19, 2006	July 23, 2006

=== Pilot (2005) ===
Title	Original release date	Prod. code
"Operation Blackout"	November 6, 2005	100
The Minoriteam set out to rescue successful black entrepreneur Sebastian Jefferson after The White Shadow kidnaps him. His plan is to stop black businesses from gaining power. The Minoriteam does battle with The Corporate Ladder and The Standardized Test along the way.

=== Season 1 (2006) ===
No.	Title	Original release date	Prod. code
1	"Tribe & Prejudice"	March 19, 2006	105
After the Shysta Gumfat Indian Reservation Parking Lot Tribe's construction of a new casino is halted, due to it being built on a Pilgrim burial ground, the Minoriteam is called in to investigate. Upon searching the catacombs beneath the construction site they soon discover the true plan set forth by the White Shadow and his army of Zombie Pilgrims.
2	"El Dia Gigante"	March 26, 2006	104
Corporate City holds a lifetime achievement award in honour of El Jefe. During the ceremony, El Jefe's father and famous wrestler, El Yo attack the team with a giant salsa puking Piñata. After Fasto and Jewcano are captured, it's up to El Jefe to confront his father and defeat him in a gruelling wrestling match.
3	"Heaven Can Wait"	April 2, 2006	106
After a racist bomb blows Fasto right past black Heaven and lands him in Nordic Heaven (Valhalla), El Jefe is the only one, with his 1/18 Viking blood, to go and save Fasto from the dead Nordic women.
4	"His Story"	April 9, 2006	103
The White Shadow uses a celestial object called the White Hole to travel back in time and try to prevent Minoriteam from coming into existence. With help from a Stephen Hawking-like character, the team goes back also to try to stop it. They visit the Maya, the ancient Egyptians and Moses, Abraham Lincoln and the Civil War battlefield at Petersburg, Eskimos crossing the Bering Straits, the Sistine Chapel, etc.
5	"Tax Day"	April 16, 2006	102
The White Shadow, the "evilest organization known to Man", is audited by Sheldon of the IRS, an organization "even more evilest". After years of shady schemes and poor funds, he finds his own corporation is in trouble. Jewcano learns the White Shadow's secrets. Special Guest Stars: Peter Graves as Sheldon, Dicky Barrett as Dirty Cop
6	"Illegal Aliens"	April 23, 2006	101
The Minoriteam is abducted by other-worldly creatures who wish to learn more about stereotypes. Back on Earth, the White Shadow and the company get a little bored without the Minoriteam to fight. Special Guest Star: Kevin McDonald as Alien Leader
7	"And Justice for Some"	April 30, 2006	107
The White Shadow tricks the Minoriteam into entering a mirror world where everything is backwards. The team is quickly put on trial for not being racist. Note: Inspired by Through the Looking-Glass.
8	"Women's Suffrage"	May 7, 2006	109
One woman holds the key to saving summer when questionable weather forecasting becomes deadly. Minoriteam discriminates against her as badly as one would expect the White Shadow to do.
9	"Space Driftin"	May 14, 2006	110
An interdimensional space hippie called Space Drifter comes and shows Dr. Wang what life would be like if he never existed in a way that is similar to It's a Wonderful Life. Special Guest Star: Chris Elliott as Space Drifter
10	"Universal World Games"	May 21, 2006	111
It is said in the book of prophecies that if the Bahamas win 69 gold medals in the Universal World Games, the world will come to an end. This leads White Shadow and his minions into using their 'powers' to try to win the games. In order to stop them, Minoriteam must disguise themselves as Chekbanian athletes to keep the White Shadow from destroying the world.
11	"THE FOG!"	May 28, 2006	112
A grape-flavoured fog turns everyone's worst nightmares into reality. Non-Stop, who is immune to the fog due to his alter-ego's excessive cannabis use, is the only one who can save the day.
12	"The Internet"	June 4, 2006	108
The White Shadow has a new secret weapon – a tool known to technology aficionados as the Internet. The Minoriteam must stop him before he uses deadly search engines to uncover their true identities. Special Guest Star: Abby Elliott as Computer
13	"Evilfellas"	June 11, 2006	113
As far back as he can remember, Corporate Ladder always wanted to be a minion. Follow his rise from a step-stool in White Shadows boardroom to a full-blown minion. Note: The episode is a parody of Casino and Goodfellas told as 1980s flashbacks.
14	"Landon In Love"	June 18, 2006	114
Fasto's loyalties are put to the test when his mild-mannered alter ego Landon is romantically pursued by a beautiful fellow professor who hates Fasto. While Fasto shirks his crime-fighting responsibilities to go on a date as Landon, an incomplete Minoriteam tries to capture a criminal named Gold Digger who coincidentally, relies on super-speed to rob banks. Special Guest Star: Elizabeth Peña as Gold Digger/Maria
15	"Le Black Coq"	June 25, 2006	115
Every villain has a back-story, and one-time successful restaurant owner John Le Coq is no exception. Watch as, in exciting flashback form, White Shadow recounts the rise and fall of The Black Coq to his visitor, the Devil. Racist Frankenstein gets his head stuck in the Corporate Ladder.
16	"Tremendous Class"	July 2, 2006	116
Fasto, Jewcano, and Dr. Wang take off for a first-class vacation paid for in part by a settlement from a fake accident staged by Dr. Wang. They discover a flight section far beyond the first class where White Shadow & his friends are living it up. They adopt disguises which are mostly rich minority stereotypes to crash it. Meanwhile, Nonstop makes the mistake of attempting to pass airport security in full costume. He is arrested and searched supposedly because he looks like a terrorist. El Jefe does not appear in the episode because in his normal life as a CEO, he was attending a child's birthday party and in any case, would have been able to afford Tremendous Class for himself. Special Guest Star: Drew Pinsky as Caretaker of Tremendous Class.
17	"The Assimulator"	July 9, 2006	117
The White Shadow introduces the Assimulator, a villain who can transform into anything he touches. He is sent out to destroy the Minoriteam by turning them against each other and to steal Dr. Wang's secret tea, which is believed to be where he gets his intelligence. As he meets the members, he befriends them and shakes their hands, thereby copying their powers. Later they confront him, but Assimulator proves to be a challenge since he has all their powers. Dr. Wang's "tea" turns out to be his urine. Note: The Assimilator is a parody of Super-Adaptoid.
18	"Behold Balactus!, Part 1"	July 16, 2006	118
The White Shadow awakens an intergalactic evil called Balactus: Destroyer of Worlds. Why did White Shadow unleash the most powerful black being in the Universe? "Three (sic) words, black on black crime." But Balactus tells White Shadow that he will destroy ALL of the Earth. As Minoriteam fights in vain to stop him from destroying Earth, Fasto learns about his true past and investigates a mysterious can of black-eyed peas. Special Guest Star: Michael Clarke Duncan as Balactus
19	"Behold Balactus!, Part 2: The Blackening"	July 23, 2006	119
The White Shadow and Minoriteam team up, but fail to stop Balactus. The spirit of Fasto's father emerges from the can of black-eyed peas and summons 3 other spirits from his home planet Blackton (which was destroyed by Balactus) who tell Fasto that he can use his black rage to run faster than light to go back in time and learn the true name of Balactus. He does so and uses that name "Leslie Ira ..." to impel Balactus to leave Earth just as Balactus is about to destroy it. Fasto goes to the "Projects of Solid-tude", also from the can of black-eyed peas, but they have already suffered urban decay. Special Guest Stars: Michael Clarke Duncan as Balactus, Jimmie Walker as Fasto's Grandfather

== International broadcast ==
In Canada, Minoriteam previously aired on Teletoon's Teletoon at Night block and also aired on the Canadian version of Adult Swim.

== Home media ==
On October 13, 2010 the entire series was released on DVD by Madman Entertainment in Region 4.
