= Joseph Scrimshaw =

American screenwriter

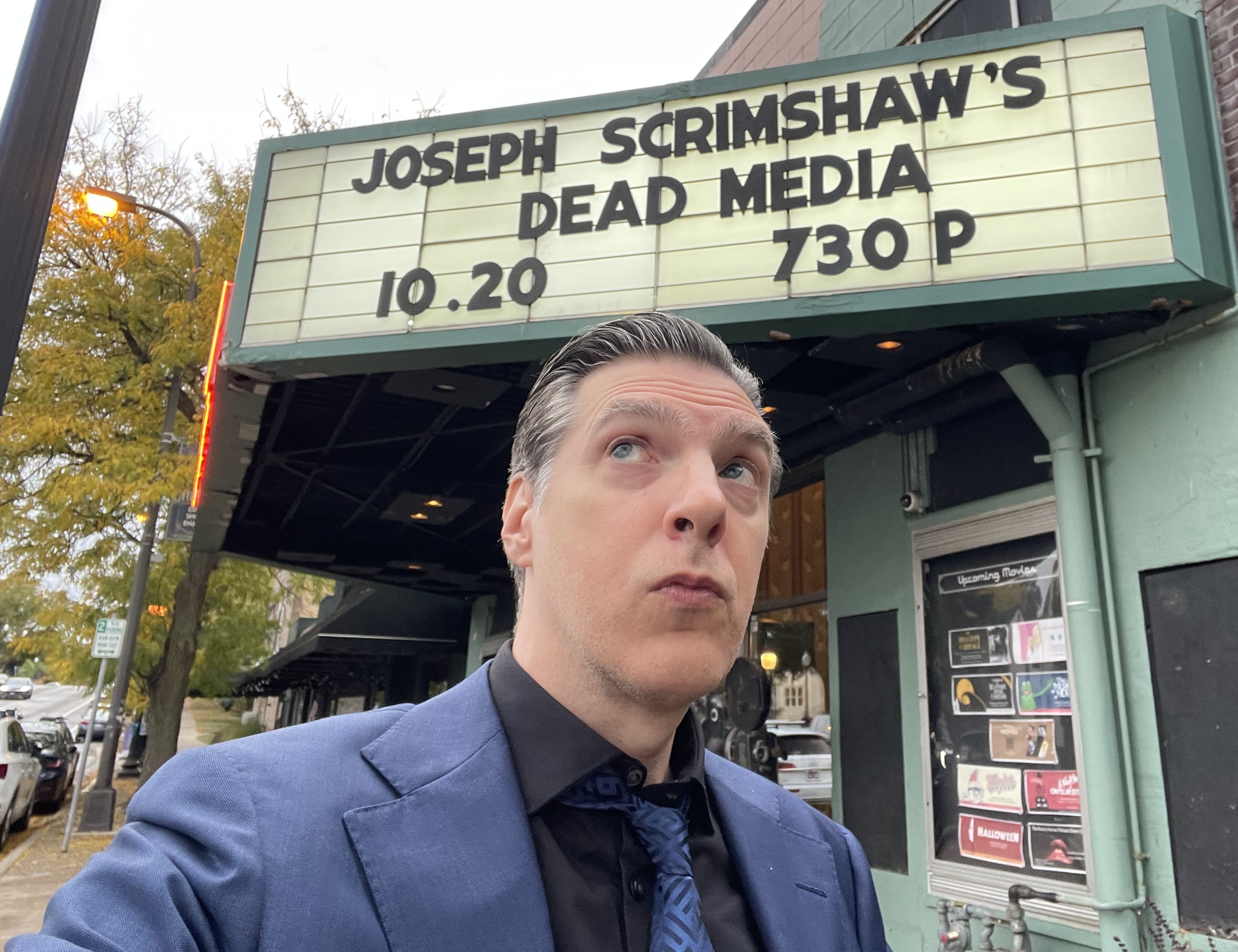
- Scrimshaw at the Dead Media premiere in Minneapolis, in 2025
- Born: Minneapolis, Minnesota, U.S.
- Occupations: Director, writer, comedian
- Website: www.josephscrimshaw.com

Joseph Scrimshaw is an American director, comedian, and writer for radio, television and theater. City Pages, a Twin Cities newspaper, describes Scrimshaw as having an "irreverent and insightful wit." He is best known for short films The Narrator (2023) and The Nightmare Adorable (2023) and the feature film Dead Media (2025) as well as writing for Adult Swim show Tigtone. He is also an author, podcast host, and standup comedian. He has collaborated with performer Bill Corbett on a number of plays and written for RiffTrax, Corbett's joint comedy venture with Kevin Murphy and Michael J. Nelson. His plays have been performed internationally. Scrimshaw has been involved with writing and performing for American Public Media's radio variety show Wits, writing sketches and appearing as the character Theater Ghost. He has also written for the national sketch comedy television show M@dAbout.

== Career ==
Scrimshaw began his career in Minneapolis, MN, performing sketch and improv comedy with his brother Joshua English Scrimshaw in late night cabarets called The Ballyhoo Players, Look Ma No Pants and The Scrimshaw Show.

Scrimshaw wrote and performed multiple best-selling shows in the Minnesota Fringe Festival, including comic plays, solo shows, and audience interactive comedies.

From 2008 to 2013, Scrimshaw was an active member of the Rockstar Storytellers, with whom he performed regularly at the Bryant-Lake Bowl in Minneapolis.

In 2009, Scrimshaw formed his own production company Joking Envelope with his wife Sara Stevenson Scrimshaw, which focuses on creating, producing and publishing comedic works. The company takes its name from Sigmund Freud's essay on comic theory, "Jokes and Their Relation to the Unconscious."

As a writer, Scrimshaw is currently working with John Kovalic's Dork Storm Press developing Dr. Blink, Superhero Shrink for movies and television. As a performer, he regularly appears at theaters, concert venues and science fiction conventions across the country, and hosts his podcast Obsessed.

In 2023, Scrimshaw formed Strange Path Productions to further develop his film concepts.

=== Film and television ===
Scrimshaw has written for the national educational TV show M@dAbout, which describes itself as Saturday Night Live meets the Electric Company.

He has also written for RiffTrax, the downloadable comic audio commentaries for movies produced by Bill Corbett, Kevin Murphy and Michael J. Nelson. Scrimshaw contributed jokes used in the MP3s for The Return of the King, Avatar, Terminator Salvation, Inception, Order of the Phoenix, The Half-Blood Prince, and more.

Scrimshaw appears in the music video "Nothing to Prove" by the Doubleclicks, created to address the "fake geek girl" controversy.

With longtime collaborator Tim Uren, Scrimshaw produced and acted in the short film series Spooky Spooky Scary Scary, featuring Cthulhu-loving characters Chuck and Dexter and their comic misadventures which has played at the H.P. Lovecraft Film Festival and science fiction convention CONvergence.

He is credited as a staff writer for all episodes for the Adult Swim series Tigtone. Scrimshaw scripted Season 1, Episode Five Tigtone and The Wizard Hunt and Season 2, Episode Five Tigtone and the Murder Mystery at the Death Tournament. Tigtone and The Wizard Hunt was eligible for an animated short Oscar.

His cosmic horror short film, Unboxing The Cosmos, was an official selection of the 2022 H.P. Lovecraft Film Festival.

In 2023, Scrimshaw wrote and directed the short film The Narrator starring Phil Marr, which won a Silver Award for Best Experimental Short at Portland Festival of Cinema, Animation & Technology in 2023.

Also in 2023 Scrimshaw wrote and directed the short film The Nightmare Adorable, starring Amy Vorpahl, Hal Lublin, and Ken Napzok. The film follows the hosts of a horror chat show as they celebrate their favorite fictional monster, Bapholeth, by selling a cute toy in his image—only to be attacked by a very real cultist offended by the adorable blasphemy.

Scrimshaw released his first feature film Dead Media in 2025. The film stars Minnesota actor Sam Landman as an aging hipster trying to share the joys of physical media with his horror fan niece, played by Sammi-Jack Martincak. The film's supporting cast also includes Anna Sundberg, James Urbaniak, and Bill Corbett. It was filmed in his hometown of Minneapolis, MN and features many local actors.

=== Live Performances ===
Scrimshaw has performed on Jonathan Coulton's geek performance-themed cruise JoCo Cruise since 2011 with people like Wil Wheaton, John Hodgman, Paul and Storm, Bill Corbett, Kevin Murphy, Paul F. Tompkins, Marian Call, Molly Lewis, the Doubleclicks and more.

His work on American Public Media's Wits involved writing sketches and appearing as the character Theater Ghost.

He has also performed in the geek vaudeville w00tstock, brainchild of Wil Wheaton, Paul & Storm and Adam Savage, at San Diego Comic-Con.

In 2012 he was part of singer-songwriter Marian Call's lineup for the Rocketfest fundraiser for the U.S. Space & Rocket Center in Alabama, also known as Space Camp.

Scrimshaw has toured with the nerd-folk duo the Doubleclicks and singer-songwriter Molly Lewis, and they have been featured guests on his podcast Obsessed.

He often performs at science fiction conventions around the country, including Dragon Con in Atlanta and CONvergence in Minneapolis.

He's a member of the Rock Star Storytellers performance group, often sharing stories that evolve into shows he later produces.

=== Theater ===
Joseph Scrimshaw has collaborated with performer Bill Corbett on two shows, My Monster and CineMadness, which they have performed at the sketch comedy festival San Francisco SketchFest. His company Joking Envelope produced Bill Corbett's play Super-Powered Revenge Christmas #1, which led to Corbett's Kickstarter campaign to produce a comic based on his work.

Scrimshaw commissioned and directed a script by Peter Sagal for "Thirst: The No Round," a Minnesota marriage amendment benefit in 2012 that featured short plays performed in midst of the dining room of a local restaurant.

Scrimshaw has a history of top-selling shows in the Minnesota Fringe Festival where he developed scripts that have since been produced around the world. These plays include An Inconvenient Squirrel, Adventures in Mating, and The Worst Show in the Fringe, and have played in New York, Seattle, Orlando, Dallas, Las Vegas, the UK, Bulgaria, Peru, the middle of the Caribbean Sea, as well as bars and theaters in Minneapolis and St. Paul.

He's also an actor for hire in the Twin Cities, notable in his role as Dudley Riggs in St. Paul's History Theatre's show "Dudley: Rigged for Laughter!"

An advocate for the arts, he has also been writing the Ivey Awards show since 2010, a major event that celebrates Twin Cities professional theater.

=== Albums ===
Scrimshaw's Verbing the Noun comedy album was recorded at the CONvergence science fiction convention and focuses on dating advice for geeks.

In 2013 and 2014, his Flaw Fest Kickstarter produced two albums, one of his stand-up comedy routine celebrating his flaws; the second of songs riffing on these flaws, created by a variety talented musicians including John Roderick, Paul & Storm, John Munson, Molly Lewis et al.

=== Books ===
Using Kickstarter, Scrimshaw was able to publish his first book of comic essays, "Comedy of Doom," in 2012.

He also published a recipe for a taco doughnut in the All the Nomz: The Cookbook for Hungry Geeks, created as a fundraiser for the Child's Play charity that donates books, toys and games to children in hospitals. Fellow contributors include Phil Plait, Bonnie Burton, Tara Platt, Yuri Lowenthal, Paul & Storm, Molly Lewis et al.

Published in Fall 2013, he contributed an essay to The Munchkin Book, a companion to the game Munchkin.

=== Podcasts ===
In February 2012, Scrimshaw started his Obsessed podcast, which was featured on iTunes as a "Staff Favorite" in Fall of 2012 and features guests such as Virginia Corbett, Jeremy Messersmith, Paul Cornell, C. Robert Cargill, Ari Hoptman, and more discussing their various obsessions. In 2015, Obsessed was picked up by the Feral Audio Network. Other guests have included Jeff B. Davis, Bill Corbett, James Urbaniak, Ali Spagnola, Mike Drucker, Molly Lewis, Trace Beaulieu, Mary Jo Pehl, OK Go's Dan Kanopka, and Tony Thaxton.

Continuing to explore this media, he wrote the "Death by Fire" episode of actor James Urbaniak's podcast Getting On With James Urbaniak.

In 2013, Scrimshaw appeared in an episode of the Nerdist Writer's Podcast recorded on JoCo Cruise.

In 2012, Scrimshaw appeared with Paul F. Tompkins on Paul and Storm's podcast in episode "Show #125: Paul Lynde as Grand Moff Tarkin (LIVE!).":

In 2015 Scrimshaw replaced Ken Napzok as a regular co-host of the Jedi Alliance vodcast (presented by the Popcorn Talk Network) alongside Mark Donica for several episodes until March 2016, when he passed on hosting duties to John Rocha.

In late 2015, Scrimshaw co-created the Star Wars based Forcecenter podcast feed with fellow former Jedi Alliance host Ken Napzok and writer and actress Jennifer Landa. He co-hosts the main show, Forcecenter, and hosts Databank Brawl, in which he and his guests make Star Wars characters fight. The show has been running for over 10 years and is often in the top 200 TV & Film podcasts on podcast charts.

In 2016, Scrimshaw appeared on the Harmontown podcast with Dan Harmon, Jeff B. Davis, and Spencer Crittenden.

=== Other projects ===
Patreon. Scrimshaw launched on crowdfunding platform Patreon in 2014 as a way to support his writing of blog posts.

Star Wars as Tweets. Scrimshaw wrote and subsequently performed the story of Episode IV: A New Hope as communicated by the Twitter feeds of the main characters. The bit proved popular so Scrimshaw and Doug McBride published a text version.

Geek a Week. Joseph was featured in Len Peralta's series of trading cards. After interviewing Joseph, Peralta decided to illustrate him as Superman heating chicken with his eyes.

Twitter. Scrimshaw is very active as a comedian on Twitter. Various tweets have been featured in national news outlets. Every month, Scrimshaw also tweets a series of daily jokes on a topic such as tacos, monkeys, or affirmations. He collects each month's tweet series on his blog in a Daily Tweet Collection.

== Personal life ==
Joseph Scrimshaw received a B.S. Degree in Visual Art, Rhetoric, Cultural Studies and Comparative Literature from the University of Minnesota.

== Work ==
=== Filmography ===
- Spooky Spooky Scary Scary
- Forbidden Donut Productions YouTube Channel featuring "Antiques Roadshow: Arkham MA" (June 16, 2007)
- Special Research Division YouTube Channel featuring "Let the Customer Win" (August 31, 2007)
- Least I Could Do, Writer (2012)
- RiffTrax, Writer (2027)
- Tigtone, Staff Writer (2019–2020)
- The Narrator, Writer and Director (2023)
- The Nightmare Adorable, Writer and Director (2023)
- Dead Media, Writer and Director (2025)

=== Bibliography ===
- Adventures in Mating (play)
- Armbruster, Jessica (February 11, 2009) "Adventures in Mating" CityPages Calendar
- All the Nomz: The Cookbook for Hungry Geeks (contributed recipe)
- Brain Fighters (play)
- Comedy of Doom (book of essays)
- The Damn Audition (play)
- Fat Man Crying (play)
- An Inconvenient Squirrel (play)
- My Monster with Bill Corbett (play)
- Nightmare Without Pants (play)
- Sexy Librarian: A Rock Musical (musical)
- Stitch, Bitch and Die (play)
- The Worst Show in the Fringe (play)

=== Discography ===
- Flaw Fest: a Comedy and Music Album, funded on Kickstarter in 2013
- Verbing The Noun, February 2013
