= Geek girl =

Gendered subgenre

Geek girl is a gendered subgenre within the modern geek subculture.

== History ==
The return of the word "geek" in the mid-1990s can be traced to the popularization of workplace computing and the Internet and the dot-com bubble of 1995–2000. The early days of the reclaimed use of "geek" were strongly associated with computers and information technology and the majority of practitioners were male. Similarly, in a 1996 study of high school cultures, linguist Mary Bucholtz noted that "nerd status is overwhelmingly associated with males." Two studies by the Association for Computing Machinery (ACM) quantified the gap between men and women in computing and the continuing problems in recruiting and retaining female programmers.

The term "Geekgirl" was coined by Rosie Cross in 1993 as the title of her online cyberfeminist magazine. This is Australia's longest running online publication and in September 1996 it was exhibited at the New Museum of Contemporary Art New York. Editions of this magazine from the mid-'90s have been preserved by the Internet Archive. As the use of the personal computer grew during the mid- to late 2000s, the number of women in computing rose proportionately, and networks were created to provide support and connection for self-described "geek girls". GirlGeeks.org was created in 1999 to serve as "the source for women in computing", and in 2005 Girl Geek Dinners was formed to connect women in the information technology (IT) sector.

The widespread recognition of "geek girls" as a community occurred in summer 2010, when the annual San Diego Comic-Con included a panel entitled "Geek Girls Exist". Panelists included StarWars.com journalist Bonnie Burton, singer-songwriter Marian Call, Tekzilla and Qore host Veronica Belmont, MythBusters featured host Kari Byron, and was hosted by Rielly Grey, founder of Geek Girls Network. The panel's popularity has been credited as a primary mover in solidifying the girl geek concept.

== Types ==
The term geek girl is in some ways fractured between its technical and cultural uses. The strongest association remains with computing, IT, and engineering. Practicing "geek girls" then include video game executive Jade Raymond, computer scientist and Yahoo! CEO Marissa Mayer, social media developer Leah Culver, and engineer Limor Fried of Adafruit Industries.

"Geek girl" is also a term applied to women who engage in journalism and media about technology, typically through the Internet rather than traditional print media, such as tech journalist Natali Morris. Perhaps the most well-known variety of the "geek girl" is the gamer, who typically engages in video and/or live role-playing games. In 2007, actress and gamer Felicia Day popularized the archetype through the webseries The Guild and the YouTube viral video "(Do You Wanna Date My) Avatar".

=== Fake ===
"Fake geek girl" is a pejorative term for a woman who is accused of feigning interest in geeky topics such as video games or comic books to get attention from men. The topic was the subject of controversy in 2012 and 2013, when multiple articles were published supporting or condemning the concept.

Much of the controversy surrounding the concept of fake geek girls began in March 2012, when Tara Brown published an article on the Forbes website titled "Dear Fake Geek Girls: Please Go Away". In the article, she discussed the difference between geeky women as social outcasts, and "pretentious females who have labeled themselves as a 'geek girl' [who have] figured out that guys will pay a lot of attention to them if they proclaim they are reading comics or playing video games."

Joe Peacock continued this criticism to discuss booth babes and female cosplayers in a July 2012 blog post for CNN titled "Booth babes need not apply". In this article, he denounced women who pretend to be interested in geek culture to gain attention from men or to advance their modelling careers. Comic artist Tony Harris wrote a Facebook post in November 2012, described by The Daily Dot as a "diatribe", about female cosplayers who were not knowledgeable about the characters they were representing.

Criticism of fake geek girls has given rise to other phenomena, such as the "Idiot Nerd Girl" image macro. These articles prompted considerable response. Some people argued that fake geek girls did not exist, or were more rare than the criticism suggested. Kirk Hamilton wrote in Kotaku that people perceived to be fake geek girls simply had interests that varied, in aspect or degree, from those of a male reader. Some responses describe the criticism as misogynist and as a form of gatekeeping.

== Later developments ==
In September 2010, the geek girl group Team Unicorn was formed by four "gamer girls", who produced the YouTube video "G33k & G4m3r Girls" as a parody of the song "California Gurls" by Katy Perry. The video went viral within a week, but the name of the group was intended to reflect the invisible status of women in the geek subculture: "Geek Girls: Like unicorns, we're not supposed to exist."

In late 2010, the Seattle-based non-profit GeekGirlCon announced that it would hold the first conference devoted to geek girls on October 8–9, 2011.

In April 2011, New York Times television reviewer Ginia Bellefante caused a minor uproar by characterizing the medieval-fantasy series Game of Thrones as "boy fiction" that "no woman alive" would wish to watch. The review prompted a direct response from GeekGirlCon, as well as a flurry of discussion from bloggers and other news outlets.

The web series Reel Geek Girls was formed in 2015 by Drew C. Ryan to confront the concept of "Fake Geek Girls" by spotlighting and interviewing women involved in the entertainment industry. Each episode, a lady shares her personal stories of harassment, accusations of being a "fake geek," and also "geeks out" about the interests and topics she loves.

== See also ==
- Gamergate controversy
- Women and video games
- Girl Geek Dinners
