= Geek a Week =

Geek a Week is an art project created by comic artist Len Peralta. Started in March 2010, Peralta's goal was to create illustrations and text for cards from a hypothetical collectible card game, creating one card each week. He sought to meet many geek icons across numerous disciplines, including computing, movies, television, music, and Internet culture, then subsequently creating that person's or group's respective card. Though not his initial goal, Peralta and ThinkGeek published the set of cards in blocks of eight after Peralta completed the initial 52-card set.

== History ==
The idea of Geek a Week arose while Len Peralta assisted in helping Trace Beaulieu illustrate his book, Silly Rhymes for Belligerent Children. Peralta offered his suggestion of the Geek a Week project to Beaulieu. Beaulieu found the idea exciting, and began to help Peralta set up contacts with the various personalities he sought for the project.

Beaulieu uses his own contacts, including fellow Mystery Science Theater 3000 alumni, Kevin Murphy, to make further plans for personalities to meet with Peralta, such as for "Weird Al" Yankovic. Some personalities that Peralta had met before or during the project helped to make further introductions; Paul and Storm was able to connect Peralta to Adam Savage. Other featured personalities contacted Peralta directly after seeing other nerds highlight their appearance on the cards; for example, Felicia Day became interested after seeing both Wil Wheaton and Jonathan Coulton announced their cards on Twitter. Several of those that participated felt the project was a positive medium for the geek culture; Savage called the project "the kind of innovative ambition that's awesome when you see someone do it", while Yankovic believed that the project would help other people of the geek culture "realize that there are more people like them, and here are these successful ones, and perhaps that will inspire them to greater achievement".

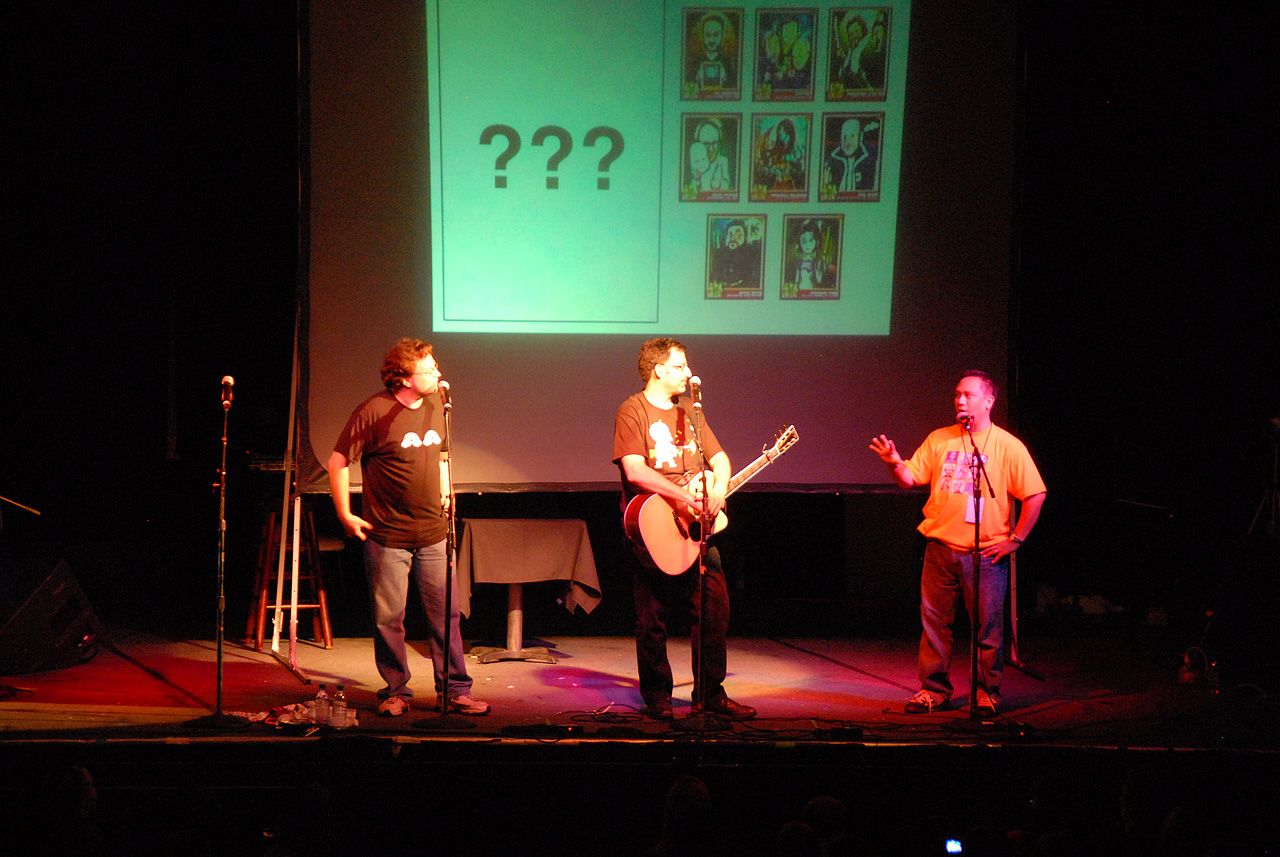
Peralta (right) and Paul and Storm introduce the Geek a Week set at the 2010 w00tstock event.

After arranging contact with the personality, Peralta would often interview the person, offering the audio as a podcast. He would then work with the personality for the card's artwork, incorporating elements that the personality was known for, amalgamated with popular culture imagery from film, television, comics, and video games. For example, Yankovic's image is similar to that of Galactus playing off the phrase "Devourer of Worlds", referencing's Yankovic's food obsession. Wheaton requested to explore duality in his card, and Peralta realized this by given Wheaton's illustration the idea of an evil twin. Savage, initially unhappy with his initial drawing, felt that Peralta's first iteration was "too harsh", and later poised for Peralta via webcam, holding the Brazil-inspired mask and pose that Peralta drew. The text of the card was created by Peralta, with editing help from collaborators, including Paul and Storm and Neil Gaiman. Personalities were often pleased with the pairings that Peralta created when left to decide on his own. Day, appearing as Chell from the video game Portal, praised Peralta's art, in that "he paired me with just the right thing to make me excited to see myself". Aaron Douglas, drawn as The Comedian from Watchmen, stated that "I love that you can be badass and a geek and I think that Len nailed it". Gaiman, depicted as "The Vault Keeper" akin to Tales from the Crypt, believed his match was very appropriate as "there's probably little that's more iconic than one of the old EC Comics horror hosts".

=== Physical production ===
Early in the project, Peralta has received some requests to actually produce the card set as a physical product, an idea that he kept in mind during the course of the year. In late February 2011, Peralta and ThinkGeek had arranged to print the full set in blocks of eight; Peralta will create four more cards with "secret geeks" to round out the number to 56, creating seven sets for purchase. Alongside the initial sales of the cards, special auctions on eBay were created featuring not only cards from the set autographed by the personalities depicted, but other memorabilia from those people, such as road spikes from Savage's MythBusters or honey made from Gaiman's private apiary. Money from the auctions was donated to the charities Child's Play and Electronic Frontier Foundation.

=== Follow-up projects ===
Following the success of the first "season" of 52 cards, Peralta decided to create a second series of cards, announcing the set at the 2011 DragonCon "Geek-a-Week Reunion" panel event along with several personalities that were already featured in the first set. The series was backed through a Kickstarter crowd-sourcing campaign in September 2011, aimed to produce a smaller run of cards in a "Geek-A-Week 2.0" series, offering incentives such as autographed cards for funding the project. The Kickstarter was successful, and an additional 15 cards were produced. Peralta successfully repeated the Kickstarter process in May 2012 with a third season of 15 cards, this time focused on specifically on "Legends of Video Games".
