= Geek & Sundry =

Commercial YouTube Channel

Geek & Sundry, Inc.
- Logo used since 2024
- Type: Subsidiary
- Industry: Web series and podcast production
- Founded: January 13, 2012; 14 years ago
- Founder: Felicia Day, Kim Evey, Sheri Bryant
- Headquarters: Hollywood, California, United States
- Parent: Legendary Digital Networks
- Website: www.geekandsundry.com

Geek & Sundry, Inc. is a commercial YouTube and Twitch channel and multimedia production company. It was launched on April 2, 2012, by actress Felicia Day with Kim Evey and Sheri Bryant as part of YouTube's 100 million dollar original channel initiative. The company is primarily known for their launch of the D&D show Critical Role, which aired on their channels from 2015–19.

Geek & Sundry operated independently until it was acquired by Legendary Entertainment in 2014. Critical Role was a breakout hit for the channel the following year, and became the most popular show on the network by far. Geek & Sundry went on to produce many shows exclusively for Legendary's streaming service, Alpha, from its launch in 2017. In early 2019, Critical Role Productions separated from Legendary; in the wake of their departure, Alpha was shut down and Geek & Sundry went into decline. The company went largely inactive in late 2019 with the YouTube channel primarily used to re-release existing content, though new videos were uploaded sporadically until April 2023.

A relaunch and partnership with podcast platform Realm Media took place in September 2024; the channel has returned to producing original actual play content.

== History ==
=== Independent era (2011–2014) ===
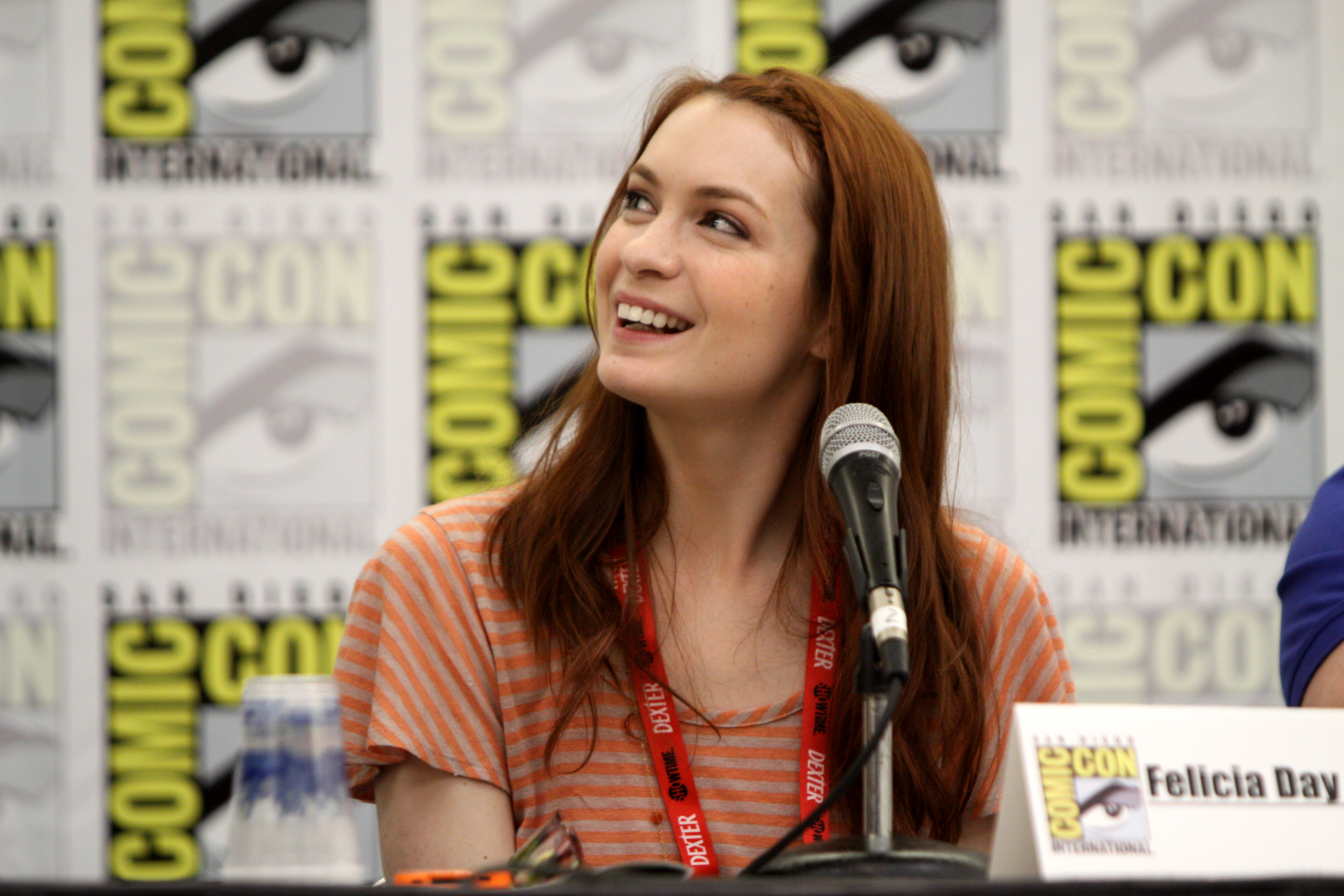
G&S founder Felicia Day, pictured in 2011.

The company originated as a pitch made to the YouTube Original Channel Initiative by Felicia Day and Kim Evey. The two learned of the initiative in fall 2011, and set about producing a pitch based on a fifth and sixth season of The Guild, Wil Wheaton's Tabletop, Day's The Flog, and Sword & Laser (hosted by Veronica Belmont and Tom Merritt) among other shows. Some of the shows in the pitch were only devised the day before the meeting with YouTube. Around half of the package of shows received funding in the form of an advance payment "against future advertising revenue to jumpstart production."

The channel's founders and show hosts attended a number of fan conventions over the following years including ComicCon, Dragon*Con, VidCon, and WonderCon. In June 2012, Forbes suggested that "if successful, it could help blaze a trail for the future of network television." In March 2013, the channel announced three new series: Felicia's Ark (featuring Felicia Day), Fetch Quest (created by Jordan Allen-Dutton) and The Player One[s]. Two programs, Tabletop and Space Janitors, were renewed for season 2 of the channel starting April 1, 2013. Day later described the production schedule for the company as exhausting, as they were producing a large amount of content with only eight full time staff at the time. She came close to "pulling the plug", but elected to keep going, and received a second round of funding from YouTube.

YouTube announced in December 2013 that it would not be continuing to invest in original content; Geek & Sundry continued however by relying on crowdfunding support. The next season of Tabletop received $500,000 in a single week. The surge in fan support led to commercial interest in buying the business; in August 2014, Geek & Sundry was acquired by Legendary Entertainment for an undisclosed sum. In December 2014, Geek & Sundry was listed on New Media Rockstars Top 100 Channels, ranked at #68.

=== Twitch, Alpha and peak (2015–2018) ===
Geek & Sundry updated 2016 logo

In March 2015, Geek & Sundry launched their Twitch channel with a 48-hour stream in support of The Lupus Foundation. After Day heard about a private Dungeons & Dragons home game from Ashley Johnson, she approached the group about playing it in a live-streamed format for Geek & Sundry; Critical Role began airing on March 12, 2015; however, the show remained creator-owned.

On January 11, 2016, Chinese conglomerate Wanda Group announced that it concluded an agreement with shareholders to acquire Legendary Entertainment for $3.5 billion. In April 2016, "Geek & Sundry's website had 290,000 uniques [...], per comScore. On YouTube, where it got its start, it has 1.4 million subscribers". In June 2016, Legendary Digital Networks (LDN) announced a new subscription streaming service, Alpha, which would include programming from both Nerdist and Geek & Sundry. In 2016, Critical Role's spinoff show Talks Machina premiered on Geek & Sundry's Twitch channel; in January 2017, Talks Machina: After Dark premiered on Alpha and included 15–20 minutes of extra cast questions pulled from Alpha viewers.

In 2016, Felicia Day left Geek & Sundry after growing "fatigued in a less creative, more managerial role in the company". Day said "I gave it my heart and my soul. When I realized I had given as much as I could, I needed to move on". In January 2017, it was announced that Thomas Tull, Legendary's founder, had exited as Legendary Entertainment CEO and that Eric Campbell, a writer on Geek & Sundry shows such as The Flog, Felicia's Ark and Signal Boost!, would become the Director of Development for Geek & Sundry. In July, Marisha Ray became the Creative Director.

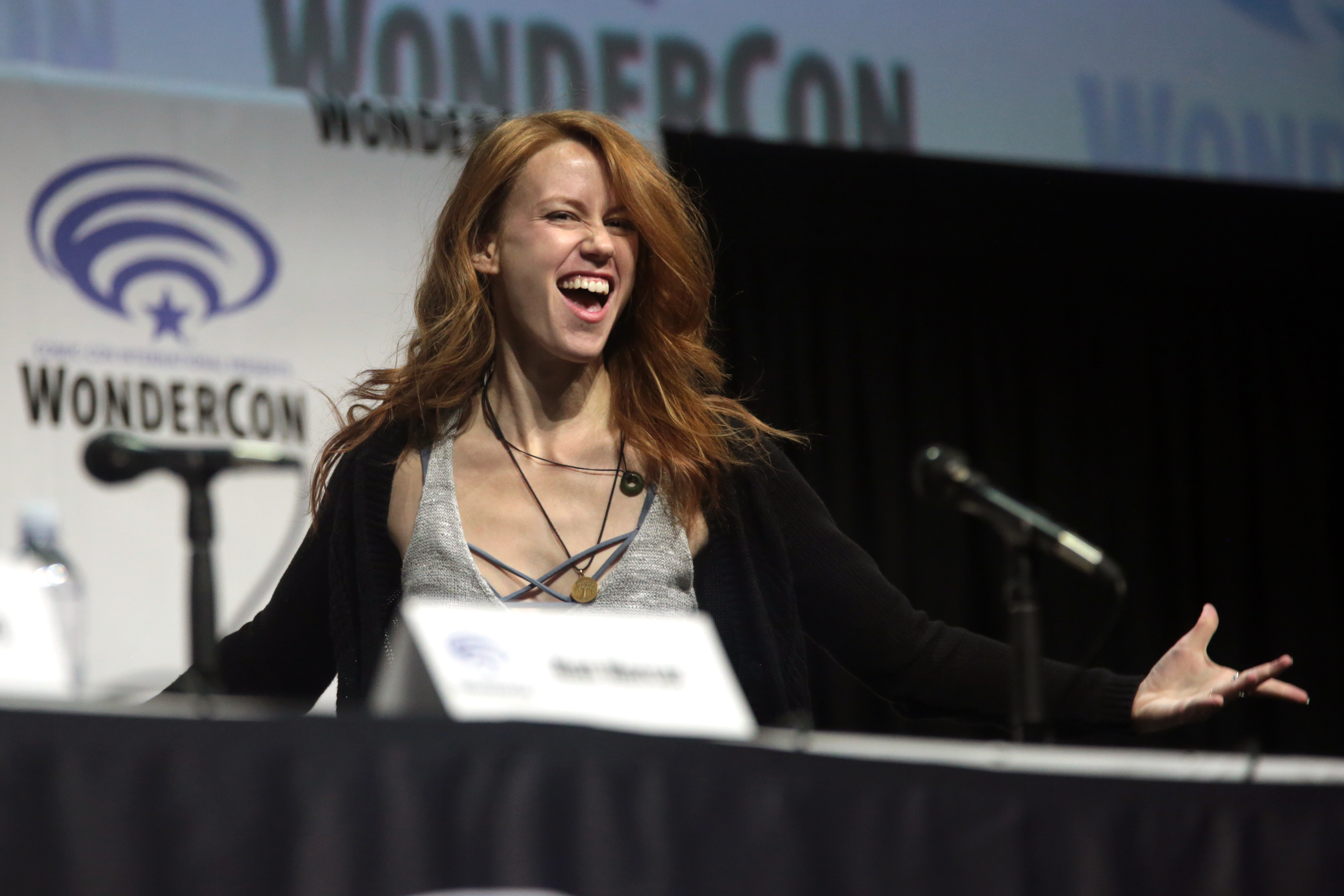
Marisha Ray, creative director during the network's Twitch subscription peak in early 2018.

From 2017 onwards, the network increasingly focused on tabletop gaming shows. This included actual play shows such as Sagas of Sundry, miniature painting with Painter's Guild and game master chat shows such as Roundtable. Season 4 of Wheaton's Tabletop was exclusive to Alpha in 2016 before premiering on YouTube in 2017. The Twitch channel reached its peak subscriber count at 55,349 in February 2018.

=== Critical Role split (2018–2019) ===
Legendary started to scale back their digital division after "Joshua Grode took over as the company's CEO in 2018". In June, Critical Role Productions started to self-produce new shows and content which did not air on Geek & Sundry's channels. Ray stepped down from her position at Geek & Sundry to become the Creative Director for Critical Role Productions; Matt Key replaced her as Creative Director, and would remain until the post was eliminated the following year.

In July 2018, the Star Trek role-playing game (RPG) show Shield of Tomorrow ended and was replaced by the superhero RPG show Callisto 6; the cast, with Campbell as the game master, were carried over to the new show. L.A. by Night (based on Vampire: The Masquerade) premiered in September as a weekly show; Jason Carl, Brand Marketing Manager for World of Darkness, acted as the Storyteller.

In February 2019, Critical Role's split from Geek & Sundry and LDN was completed, with their flagship show having been recorded at a new studio since July 2018. Critical Role and Talks Machina aired exclusively on Critical Role's channels from this point onwards, and were no longer distributed via the Alpha streaming service. The move also suspended the Alpha exclusive show Talks Machina: After Dark, which would never be reinstated on the new channels. Older episodes of Critical Role and Talks Machina were later deleted and re-uploaded to the new Critical Role channels.

=== Further splits, layoffs and decline (2019–2023) ===
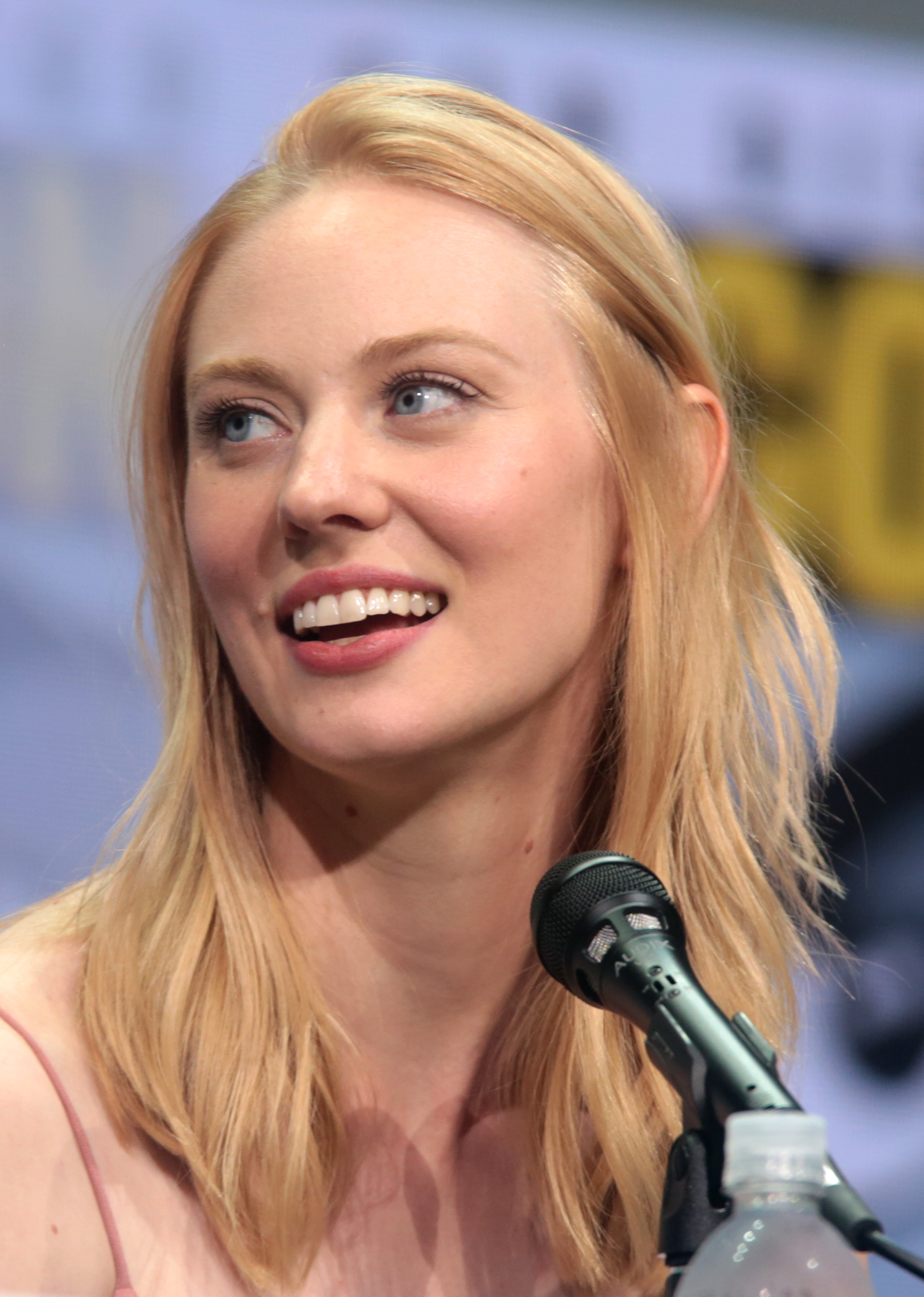
Deborah Ann Woll led Relics and Rarities and Lost Odyssey: The Book of Knowledge, two of the last tabletop shows produced by the original site

The departure of Critical Role in February 2019 marked "the beginning of a swift decline for the company", as it and Talks Machina had been Geek & Sundry's most popular shows by far. A short-lived D&D show Relics and Rarities premiered on Alpha that month; Deborah Ann Woll was the show's DM and the campaign had a celebrity guest each episode. It ran for only six episodes. The Alpha service was shut down in March – only weeks after Critical Role's departure – with Geek & Sundry content migrating to their YouTube and Twitch channels. In April 2019, Wheaton announced that he was suing Geek & Sundry for breach of contract over distribution deals for Titansgrave: The Ashes of Valkana which he was not consulted on. Campbell left Geek & Sundry in the same month, and Relics and Rarities was not picked up for a second season. Some further tabletop shows did however run during 2019, including Jason Bulmahn's Pathfinder: Knights of Everflame and Woll's Lost Odyssey: The Book of Knowledge. The latter was followed by a short series of cast interview videos.

In late 2019, Paradox Interactive's World of Darkness team took over production of L.A. By Night; seasons 1-3 remain archived on the Geek & Sundry YouTube channel while season 4 premiered exclusively on the World of Darkness Twitch channel in 2020. In January 2020, Campbell and the cast of Shield of Tomorrow/Callisto 6 launched a new Star Trek show, Clear Skies, on the QueueTimes Twitch channel. Campbell stated that Clear Skies is not a sequel and that "Shield of Tomorrow is Geek & Sundry‘s (and rightfully so). I had hoped to come back to Shield again, but honestly? We wrapped that story up so well, I love that it will exist forever as a completed campaign." Twitch subscription numbers for G&S declined rapidly from a 50,000 high in January 2018 to 300 in January 2020. Game the Game ceased broadcast in April, and the Geek & Sundry website stopped updating in June with a final episode of How to Play.

In July 2020, Legendary laid off 30% of the LDN staff. Variety reported that "there was a sense that the operations were a money drain on the company's profitable film and television operations. Those cuts were accelerated by the onset of COVID-19, which has resulted in layoffs and furloughs across the entertainment industry". The Hollywood Reporter reported that "the digital brands have become less important to the strategic direction of Legendary in recent years as the online content business has shifted away from the networks that grew big during the early heyday of YouTube stardom. Legendary Digital is not a moneymaker for the business the way its core film and TV divisions are". Twitch Tracker stopped logging subscriptions in October 2020 for the channel, at which point there were 52 remaining, and Geek & Sundry was left largely inactive.

In April 2021, CBR reported that "Geek & Sundry as an original content producer hasn't exactly been operational for a couple of years". The channels were sporadically used by Legendary to stream Nerdist shows such as Save Point and CelebriD&D, while the YouTube channel was largely used to re-release existing content. This included material that had originally been exclusive to Alpha such as CelebriD&D and We're Alive: Frontier. Additional episodes of Becca Scott's How to Play were released from February 2021 to June 2022, as the first original content on the channel since the layoffs the previous summer and the sole ongoing G&S property at the time. A single new episode of Game the Game, led by Scott, also aired in April 2023. In January 2022, Wheaton and LDN settled their lawsuit outside of court. The Geek & Sundry website began redirecting to the Nerdist website, and direct links to specific pages using the geekandsundry.com domain began to return 404 links. Geek & Sundry branding was integrated into the Nerdist website, under the "play" banner.

=== Relaunch (2024–present) ===
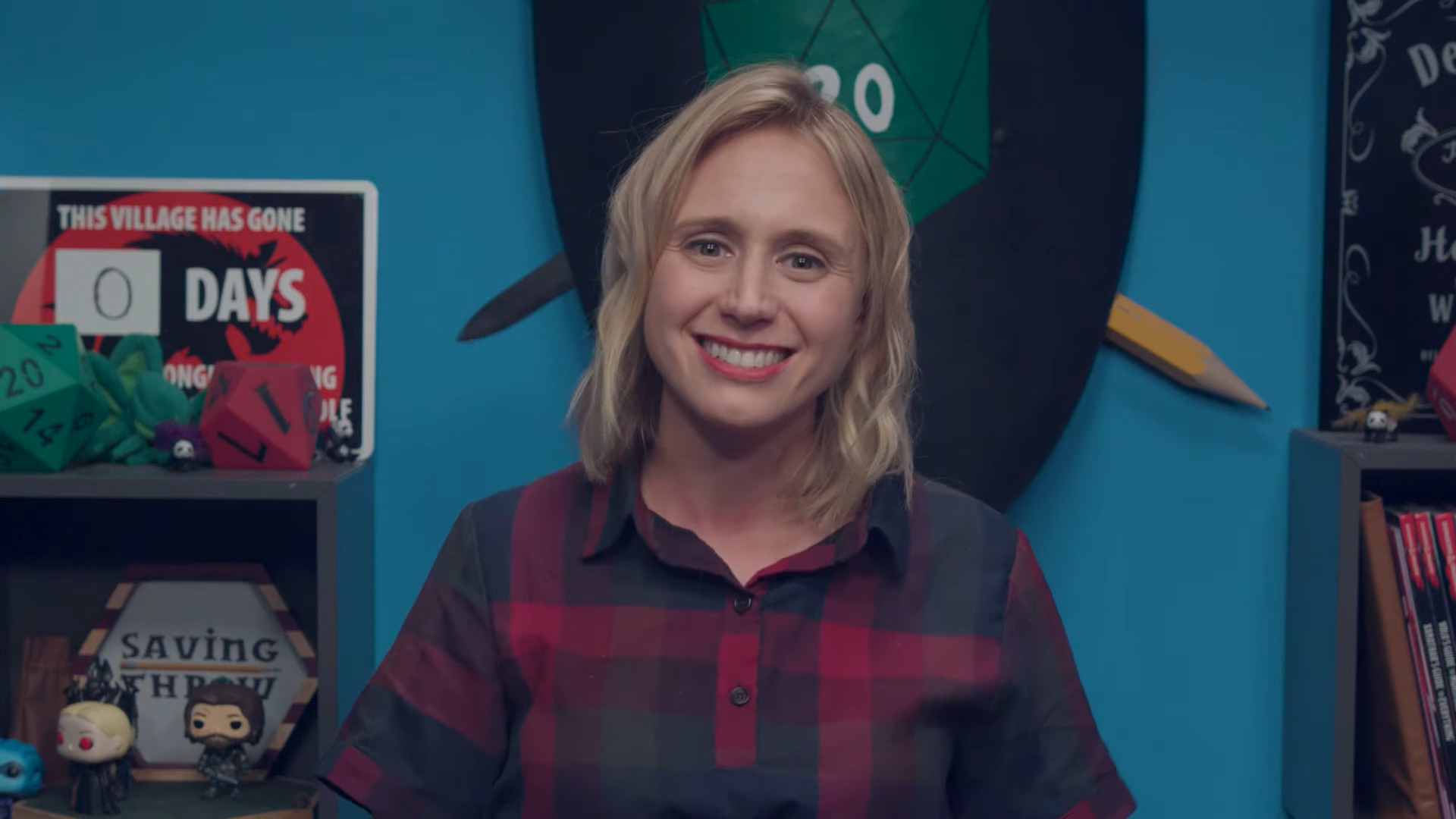
Sagas of Sundry: Goblin Mode is led by Amy Vorpahl

In August 2024, Legendary Digital Networks announced a new actual play podcast series titled Sagas of Sundry: Goblin Mode which began airing in September 2024 on Geek & Sundry's YouTube channel and on the Realm Media podcast network. It is led by game master Amy Vorpahl with Danielle Radford, Dan Casey, and Jason Nguyen as the main players. Casey, Vice President of Creative & Development at Legendary Entertainment, explained that while the previous Sagas of Sundry series was a Dread LARP/AP, the creative intention behind using Dungeons & Dragons for Sagas of Sundry: Goblin Mode was "to go back to basics" and to line up with "the 50th anniversary of Dungeons & Dragons and the 10th anniversary of Fifth Edition". On revitalizing Geek & Sundry, Casey commented that they "have been working on this relaunch for a few years" and that it had "really gained meaningful momentum in early 2023 thanks in part to [their] partnership with Realm". Casey highlighted that the relaunch's initial focus is on "video content and podcasts" with "projects in production and development that encompass everything from board gaming to wargaming to collectible card gaming to painting minis"; however, they "eventually" plan to bring back editorial content on the Geek & Sundry website.

In March 2026, Casey announced that Geek & Sundry was planning to rerelease "fan-favorite legacy content" that was "trapped" behind the former Alpha paywall now that music licensing and other clearances had been approved. The first rerelease was Sagas of Sundry: Madness which premiered on March 30, 2026 with a weekly release schedule.

== Legacy ==
International Tabletop Day originated as an event hosted on Geek & Sundry in 2013, and became a recurring annual event globally. While disrupted by the spread of the COVID-19 pandemic in 2020, the event is still celebrated worldwide. Founder Felicia Day, who left the company in 2016, spoke positively of the influence of the company and its inclusion of geek voices. "I'm just happy I got to give people opportunities they wouldn't have otherwise and take a leap." CBR commented in 2023 that "with huge shifts in management, a lawsuit between the company and Will [sic] Wheaton, and countless people leaving the company, it only makes sense that the company would largely cease its operations. [...] While Geek & Sundry may not be operational anymore, it made quite an impact on geek culture that is quite lasting. [...] Although Critical Role's departure sparked its rapid decline, Geek & Sundry has done a lot for the resurgence of interest in tabletop gaming and geeks everywhere are sure to look upon the company's golden years fondly".

Em Friedman, for Polygon, commented on the impact of Geek & Sundry's experiments in actual play cinematographic style; the simultaneous display layout, pioneered with Critical Role, would come "to dominate actual play". Friedman highlighted that Critical Role's "layout eliminated the awkward elements of the wide-angle lenses and multipurpose tables, cables, and other clutter. By cropping and arranging, it showed all angles of a table, simultaneously, live"; a simultaneous display led to player reactions becoming "a significant part of the audience experience". However, this "look wasn't a foregone conclusion. There was no standard look early on. Even in 2015, as Critical Role began to stream, Geek & Sundry was producing fullscreen, edited multi-camera shows like Wil Wheaton's Titansgrave. The channel continued to refine both styles, producing fullscreen shows like Sagas of Sundry and We're Alive: Frontier alongside simultaneous-display shows like Shield of Tomorrow, ForeverVerse, Callisto 6, and LA by Night".

A number of former Geek & Sundry shows continued airing in other formats after leaving the network, some continuing beyond when G&S had largely ceased operating in the late 2010s. Vampire the Masquerade: LA by Night was moved to the World of Darkness channel and received a fourth and fifth season before its conclusion in October 2021. LA by Night is also considered canon to the broader ongoing Vampire metaplot. Em Friedman, for Polygon, stated that L.A. by Night "survived Geek & Sundry's decline [...] in no small part to the masterful work of storyteller and series creator Jason Carl". A successor series, New York by Night, began in 2022. In May 2024, Rowan Zeoli of Rascal commented that "the collapse of Geek & Sundry [...] decimated the fledgling actual play industry". Friedman, in an interview with Zeoli, explained that "Critical Role is the only Geek & Sundry show that was able to recover its own episodes. Everything else still belongs to Geek & Sundry, including LA By Night. But Critical Role was as smart as Legendary was dumb. Legendary [the company that owned Geek & Sundry] didn't make them sign a contract until Critical Role LLC had already existed".

Several senior Legendary Digital Networks staff joined Critical Role Productions after it split in 2019, such as Ed Lopez, Rachel Romero, and Ivan van Norman who became head of their tabletop game publishing division Darrington Press. In addition to Critical Role itself, Critical Role Productions continued airing episodes of Talks Machina until the show was cancelled in 2021. By 2021, Critical Role was the highest earning channel on Twitch. The first campaign, which aired in its entirety during the G&S era, would receive an animated adaptation which began airing on Amazon Prime Video in 2022. Critical Role has also been credited with the renaissance of Dungeons & Dragons in the late 2010s, along with similar shows such as The Adventure Zone.

== Programming ==
=== Original (2012–2023) ===
Year	Title	Created by	Notes
2012	Dark Horse Motion Comics	Dark Horse	Videos based on comics published by Dark Horse Comics
2012	Sword & Laser	Veronica Belmont & Tom Merritt	A book club/video podcast based around elements of sci-fi and fantasy.
2012	MetaDating	Sean Plott	Plott and friends drink beer and play online romance simulators.
2012	#Parent	Kristen Rutherford & Mike Phirman	Rutherford & Phirman discuss topics relevant to the interests of geek parents.
2012	Written by a Kid	Dane Boedigheimer, Daniel Strange, Rhett & Link	In each episode, a child tells a story, which is used as the script in order to produce a short video.
2012	LearningTown	Paul and Storm	A sitcom starring Paul and Storm as fictional versions of themselves taking over a classic children's show.
2012	The Storyboard	Pat Rothfuss	Rothfuss' Authors' Roundtable
2012–13	The Guild	Felicia Day	The fifth and sixth season only were broadcast on Geek & Sundry. The show revolves around the lives of a gamers' online guild, The Knights of Good, who play countless hours of a fantasy MMORPG video game entitled The Game.
2012–13	On the Table	Warren Johnston	A wargames show originally run on Beasts of War before moving to Geek and Sundry.
2012–14	Vaginal Fantasy	Felicia Day	Romance novel book club, starring Felicia Day, Bonnie Burton, Kiala Kazbee, and Veronica Belmont, as they review romance novels and drink alcohol. Moved channel and ended in 2015.
2012–15	The Flog	Felicia Day	A vlog by Felicia Day each week.
2012–15	Space Janitors	Davin Lengyel and Geoff Lapaire	A live-action comedy series about a group of janitors who work for an evil overlord.
2012–17	TableTop	Wil Wheaton	In each episode, one or more boardgames are explained briefly by Wil Wheaton and then he and his guests play the game.
2013	Felicia's Ark	Felicia Day	An interactive comedy that stars Felicia Day deciding which video game animals will make it onto her Ark.
2013	Fetch Quest	Jordan Allen-Dutton	An animated, musical comedy about video-game culture created by Jordan Allen-Dutton of Robot Chicken.
2013	The Player One[s]	Ben Rock	A sketch-comedy show that stars the sketch team of the same name finding humour in video-games.
2013	Outlands	Adam de la Peña	A group explores the deep reaches of space, uncharted planets in order to build intergalactic convenience stores.
2013–17	Co-Optitude	Felicia Day	In each episode, Felicia Day and her brother Ryon Day play games that were released on older consoles such as the Genesis, Super NES, and Nintendo 64.
2013–15	Talkin' Comics Weekly	Amy Dallen	Dallen discusses her favourite comic of the week, going on adventures with guests.
2013–18	Spellslingers	Sean Plott	Sean "Day9" Plott plays Magic: The Gathering with a different guest per episode.
2014	Caper	Amy Berg & Mike Sizemore	Four superhero housemates (Penny, Dagr, Alexia, and Luke) turn to crime when the economic realities of herodom hit home.
2014	Unplugged	Ashly Burch	Burch helps turn video games into real life thrill rides.
2014	Spooked	Michael Gene Conti	A paranormal comedy featuring the world's cheapest ghost hunters.
2014	Arcade Arms	Nika Harper	A series in which Harper explores fantasy game weapons, creating and testing replicas.
2014	Morganville	Rachel Caine	Claire Danvers unknowingly moves to a town run by vampires.
2014–15	LARPs	Julian Stamboulieh and Jon Verrall	A comedy series about a group of friends who LARP, and their interactions in and out of the game. The series was picked up by Geek & Sundry after the first season had been shown in early 2014: those episodes were removed from the original channel and re-released by G&S in preparation for the second season.
2015	Titansgrave	Wil Wheaton	Wil Wheaton takes a group of 4 celebrity role players and their characters through a life-threatening adventure in a world far from our own where goblins wield laser rifles, dragons destroy hovercraft, and great war machines plunder the land.
2015–19	Omnibus	Amy Dallen & Hector Navarro	A comic book centric interview show.
2015–19	Critical Role	Matthew Mercer	Mercer acts as the Dungeon Master for a series of Dungeons & Dragons campaigns with fellow voice actors Laura Bailey, Taliesin Jaffe, Ashley Johnson, Liam O'Brien, Marisha Ray, Sam Riegel, and Travis Willingham. Moved channel and remains ongoing
2015–23	Game the Game	Ivan Van Norman, Becca Scott	A tabletop play-through series of both sponsored & non-sponsored games. A single Becca Scott led episode aired in April 2023.
2016	Anime Gateways	Xavier Woods	A Funimation sponsored anime talkshow.
2016	Max Hit Points	Blair Herter & Andrew Deutch	An RPG themed gym show.
2016	Super Fun Awesome Party Game Time	Jesse Cox & Jessica Marzipan	Cox & Marzipan take old board games, remix the rules, and create somewhat embarrassing situations with their awesome (and infinitely patient) guests.
2016–17	ESCAPE!	Janet Varney	Janet Varney takes 4 celebrity guests and place them in an escape room each week. The guests must work together and try to escape before time runs out.
2016–17	AXYB	Becca Scott, Whitney Moore, Stef Woodburn, & Blythe Wiedemann	The four hosts each control one button in Telltale adventure game where the audience makes the decisions.
2016–17	Signal Boost!	Marisha Ray	A "weekly love letter to all fandoms, be it books, podcasts, indie games, Etsy shops, soundtracks, websites, or events".
2016–17	Otaking Heads	Todd Haberkorn	An Otaku talk show.
2016–17	Worthy Opponents	Matthew Mercer & Rachel Quirico	A Hearthstone celebrity tournament.
2016–17	VAST	Jackson Lanzing	Writer Jackson Lanzing guides two separate crews of players through the VAST universe, an original IP and game system, where the show alternates between casts. The two casts are part of two different societies which allows the audience to view the same story experienced in very different way.
2016–19	The Wednesday Club	Taliesin Jaffe, Amy Dallen, & Matt Key	Taliesin, Amy and Matt discuss the latest comics weekly along with highlighting their favorites and other comic related things.
2016–19	Game Master Tips	Various	Tips from various game masters. Supported by a series of guest blog posts on the G&S website.
2016–19	Game Engine	Erika Ishii & Trisha Hershberger	Ishii & Hershberger host a gaming show. Often include interviews of people from the gaming industry, as well as a live play of a video game.
2016–19	Talks Machina	Brian W. Foster & Dani Carr	A talk show in which Critical Role cast members discuss elements of the previous week's game. Moved channel, concluded in 2021
2016–22	How to Play	Ivan van Norman, Becca Scott	Ivan van Norman explains game mechanics of both sponsored & non-sponsored games in short video tutorials. Acted as a companion series to Game the Game, before a hiatus in 2020. Further episodes hosted by Becca Scott aired sporadically from 2021 to 2022 as the sole active Geek & Sundry show.
2017	INT. Writers Room	Dave Reynolds & Molly Dworsky	In a two-hour run time, Dave & Molly along with a panel of creatives and audience chat work together to write and finalize a short sketch. The sketch is then recorded between episodes and shown to the audience the following week.
2017	Project Pixel	Mary Doodles	A digital painting tutorial show.
2017	Choose Our Destiny- Improv Adventure	The Tin Can Bros	An improv theater show with audience participation.
2017–18	Foreververse	Ivan Van Norman	A tabletop RPG show which changes system every session.
2017–18	Sagas of Sundry	Ivan Van Norman	Ivan Van Norman utilizes the rpg system Dread to lead the players through a horror campaign. Season 1, Sagas of Sundry: Dread, starred Matt Mercer, Amy Dallen, Amy Vorpahl, Satine Phoenix, and Taliesin Jaffe. Season 2, Sagas of Sundry: Madness, starred Liam O'Brien, Xander Jeanneret, Marisha Ray, Jeremy Walker, and Erika Ishii. Darin De Paul acts as the opening narrator.
2017–18	Shield of Tomorrow	Eric Campbell	A licensed Star Trek RPG Show. The Federation is on the brink of war with the Dominion. In the shadow of this cold war, the crew members of the USS Sally Ride must work together to not only protect the Federation, but protect its soul as well.
2017–18	Painters Guild	Will Friedle	A painting show centered around miniature figures, typically used for tabletop gaming.
2017–19	Ask Your Black Geek Friend!	Damion Poitier & B. Dave Walters	Co-hosts Damion Poitier & B. Dave Walters create a safe, open forum to discuss topics and ask questions surrounding diversity in pop culture.
2017–19	Roundtable	Various	A rotating cast of game masters talk about storytelling.
2017–19	TBD RPG	Eric Campbell	Originally conceived as an anthology style RPG show, the cast and game master Campbell became attached to their first episode's characters so the show instead became a full Doctor Who campaign using a rpg system by Cubicle 7. The main cast is: Amy Dallen (the Doctor), Duncan Barclay (human Cillian Rail), Gina DeVivo (human Captain Finn), and Sam de Leve (Ovokali Rokokokoko).
2017–19	Thrashtopia	Whitney Moore	A post-apocalyptic show that moves across various formats.
2017–19	Talks Machina: After Dark	Brian W Foster	An aftershow for Talks Machina, airing exclusively on Alpha. The cast would take questions directly from the chat. It was cancelled after the Critical Role split.
2018	Key Question	Marisha Ray & Matt Key	A pop culture themed question and answer show.
2018–19	Callisto 6	Eric Campbell	Superheroes are created from a blast of strange radiation in the Los Angeles of 2119. Ruled by corporations and devastated by a disaster years before, the LA of 2119 is a cyberpunk landscape in which our heroes attempt to remove the threat of an ancient evil entity as it reaches a peak of power. A live broadcast RPG using the Cypher System with 6 main characters, several recurring characters, and special guests.
2018–19	L.A. by Night	Jason Carl	Jason Carl, Brand Marketing Manager for World of Darkness, acts as Storyteller of a Vampire: The Masquerade game that focuses on four vampires of the Anarch sect who try to navigate and survive the terrifying L.A. night. Moved channel, completed in 2021.
2018–19	Starter Kit	Jason Charles Miller	A show intended to introduce viewers to tabletop role playing.
2018–19	Asinine Wisdom	Jake Bennett & Daryl Crittenden	A debate show on a variety of topics.
2018–19	Overlight: Fractured Paradox	Aliza Pearl	A tabletop show using the Overlight system.
2018–19	We're Alive: Frontier	Ivan Van Norman	A tabletop show using a post-apocalyptic theme.
2018–19	Lore Masters	Sam de Leve & Hector Navarro	A fandom history show, originally airing on Alpha.
2019	Relics and Rarities	Deborah Ann Woll	Deborah Ann Woll acts as the Dungeon Master of Dungeons & Dragons campaign focused on mystery, monsters and murder with a celebrity guest each episode.
2019	Pathfinder: Knights of Everflame	Jason Bulmahn	A Pathfinder show, in which the characters are conscripted into an army and need to support one another to survive.
2019	Game Master's Hall	Becca Scott	Twelve game masters are interviewed and share expertise.
2019	Ten Candles: Eclipse	Ivan van Norman	A horror tabletop show with 40 rotating players and a single game master.
2019–20	Lost Odyssey: The Book of Knowledge	Deborah Ann Woll	A charity D&D game supporting the Autism Society of America, collaborating with Lost Odyssey Events. The one-off game was followed by a series of interviews with cast members in early 2020.

=== Relaunch (2024–present) ===
Year	Title	Host	Notes
2024–25	Sagas of Sundry: Goblin Mode	Amy Vorpahl	A D&D actual play set in the world of Sundaros with Vorpahl as the game master. The cast features Danielle Radford, Dan Casey, and Jason Nguyen as two skeletons and a goblin who are trying to leave a lair and find their missing evil overlord.
2024–25	Quests N' Answers	Dan Casey	General tabletop game discussions. Also used as an aftershow to Sagas of Sundry: Goblin Mode, in which cast members discuss moments of the campaign.
2024	Scarlet & Violet—Stellar Crown Showdown	Alison Mattingly	A three episode limited series, sponsored by The Pokémon Company International, where Mattingly and celebrity guests (Terry Crews, Jacob Batalon, and Abigail Breslin) chat and play the Pokémon Trading Card Game.
2025	Lost Odyssey: Godfall	Bill Rehor	A charity Pathfinder 2nd Edition special to support Extra Life, in partnership with Demiplane and Lost Odyssey Events. It featured Matthew Mercer, Reggie Watts, Deborah Ann Woll, Felicia Day, and Brandon Routh as players with Rehor as the game master.
2026	Sagas of Sundry: Darkling Gate	Ross Bryant	An eight episode limited series using the Call of Cthulhu system with Bryant as the game master. The cast features Paula Deming, Noura Ibrahim, Nicole Maines, and Oscar Montoya. The series will be set in 1816, during the Regency era, and will use the Regency Cthulhu sourcebook.

== Geek & Sundry Vlogs ==
Geek & Sundry Vlogs launched on May 19, 2013, as a distinct channel. All vloggers were mentored by Felicia Day and Jenni Powell, producer of The Lizzie Bennet Diaries. Two rounds of expansion followed throughout 2013, with submissions to join the channel open to the public for official review from Geek & Sundry and the community. On February 18, 2015, it was announced that the Vlogs channel would be "coming to an end" after almost two years of operation. The final vlog was added to the channel on February 27.

=== Vloggers ===
- Wordplay Season 2 with Nika "Nikasaur" Harper (Formerly Story Mode)
- Geeking OUT with Becca Canote (Formerly also with Neil McNeil)
- Read This! with James “Tigermonkey” Isaacs (Formerly about his quest to the World Thumbwrestling Championships)
- Sachie
- Talkin' Comics with Amy Dallen (Formerly a weekly show on the main channel)
- Jeff Lewis
- Katie Satow
- Paul Mason the DIY Guy
- Critical Hit Cocktails with Mitch Hutts
- 2 Broke Geeks with Mia Resella and Omar Najam
- Cristina Viseu
- Songs of Adventure with Vaughan de Villiers and Caitlin Papier
- Dael Kingsmill
- Kiriosity with Kiri Callaghan
- Wargaming with Teri Litorco
- Old School Pixel Party with Scott Tumilty
- Akeem Lawanson
- Holland Talks Movies with Holland Farkas
- Two guest vloggers every other Tuesday
