= Da Vinci's Notebook =

American a capella group (1993-2004)

- Also known as: DVN
- Origin: Alexandria, Virginia
- Genres: A cappella, comedy
- Years active: 1993–2004
- Labels: Da Vinci's Notebook, Uncle Buford Records
- Past members: Bernie Muller-Thym; Greg DiCostanzo; Paul Sabourin; Richard Hsu; Jay Jones (1993–1994)

Da Vinci's Notebook (or simply DVN) was a comedic a cappella singing group. Former artists-in-residence at the John F. Kennedy Center for the Performing Arts, they performed specials on Comedy Central and PBS, and spent time as the "house band" on Washington radio's WBIG-FM. They were also regular guests on the nationally syndicated Bob and Tom radio show.

== History ==
=== Formation and first years (1993–1997) ===
In Alexandria, Virginia, during the summer of 1993, Bernie Muller-Thym, Greg "Storm" DiCostanzo, Paul Sabourin and Richard Hsu banded together to join a six-man a cappella group that was advertised in the Washington City Paper. Muller-Thym, DiCostanzo, and Sabourin met through the newspaper ad, while Hsu was a friend of DiConstanzo from the University of Maryland. The six-man group did not last and disbanded soon after. Muller-Thym, DiCostanzo, Sabourin, and Hsu then formed Da Vinci's Notebook. Bass singer Jay Jones joined later in the year, singing with the group until 1994.

Da Vinci's Notebook made their debut at the 1994 Mid-Atlantic Harmony Sweepstakes, where they came in third place. In 1997, they came back and won the competition.

In 1995, the group self-released their debut cassette EP Somebody Else's Greatest Hits, featuring covers of popular songs.

=== Bendy's Law (1997) ===
Da Vinci's Notebook released their first full-length studio album, Bendy's Law, in 1997, featuring guest appearances by Richard Greene and Joe Finetti of The Bobs, as well as by the band Moxy Früvous.

=== The Life and Times of Mike Fanning (1999-2001) ===
The group's second full-length album, The Life and Times of Mike Fanning, was released on December 1, 1999. The album was produced by Richard Greene, who additionally provided vocals and previously made a guest appearance on "Bendy's Law". Other guest performances include Ball in the House and Michael Clem, Eddie Hartness, and Julie Murphy Wells from Eddie from Ohio. The Life and Times of Mike Fanning occasionally utilizes musical instruments as part of the backing tracks, which was new to the group's albums.

Around this time, the group's members also quit their day jobs to perform full time. Prior to performing full time, Hsu was a system engineer, Sabourin was a graphic specialist at a law firm, Muller-Thym was an accountant, and DiCostanzo was a financial analyst. The Washington Post made several articles about them during and after the release of The Life and Times of Mike Fanning.

=== "Enormous Penis", rise in popularity and Brontosaurus (2001-2002) ===
In 2001, the song "Enormous Penis" was released as the group's first and only single. Around this time, interest in the band spiked as they began to get played on the syndicated Bob and Tom radio show. The appearance on the show led to high demand for the single. Their signature songs played on the show included "Another Irish Drinking Song", "Ally McBeal", "Enormous Penis", "Liposuction", "Face Like Billy Joel" and "Title of the Song". "Enormous Penis" remains Da Vinci's Notebook's most popular song.

The group released their final album, Brontosaurus, in the following year, which included "Enormous Penis". It was produced by Richard Greene, who had previously produced The Life and Times of Mike Fanning. Guest appearances include Eddie Hartness and Robbie Schaefer of Eddie from Ohio, Valerie Vigoda from GrooveLily, and a cappella singer-songwriter Sean Altman.

The newfound popularity brought by the Bob and Tom Show brought more critics and fans to the album, with the album releasing to positive reviews. The album was the band's final full release before disbanding in 2004.

=== Final years, disbandment, and legacy (2002-present) ===
The group toured, locally and nationally, for ten years. Highlights included some of the most prestigious folk venues and festivals on the East Coast, such as the Falcon Ridge Folk Festival.

In 2004, the band stopped touring and regular performances. Two of the members, Sabourin and DiCostanzo, then began touring as the musical duo Paul and Storm.

In addition to their albums, Da Vinci's Notebook also recorded a track called "The Ballad of The Sneak" for the Homestar Runner cartoon website. This song was credited to the entire group, though it was only written and performed by Paul and Storm.

In 2013, the group's song "Another Irish Drinking Song" was featured in the film Despicable Me 2, with new lyrics in the language of the Minions.

== Members ==
- Paul Sabourin - tenor
- Richard Hsu - tenor, keyboard
- Greg "Storm" DiCostanzo - baritone
- Bernie Muller-Thym - bass (vocal), guitar
- Jay Jones - bass (1993–1994)

== Discography ==
- Somebody Else's Greatest Hits (1995)
- Bendy's Law (1997)
- The Life and Times of Mike Fanning (1999)
- Brontosaurus (2002)
- Ballad of The Sneak (2003)

== Awards and nominations ==
Mid-Atlantic Harmony Sweepstakes

Year	Nominee / work	Award	Result
1994	Da Vinci's Notebook	Mid-Atlantic Harmony Sweepstakes	3rd
1997	Da Vinci's Notebook	Mid-Atlantic Harmony Sweepstakes	Won

Washington DC Area Music Awards

Year	Nominee / work	Award	Result
2000	Da Vinci's Notebook	Best Rock/Pop Group	Nominated
2002	Da Vinci's Notebook	Best A Cappella Group	Won
2002	Brontosaurus	Best A Cappella Recording	Won
