= Molly Lewis (ukulele player) =

American musician

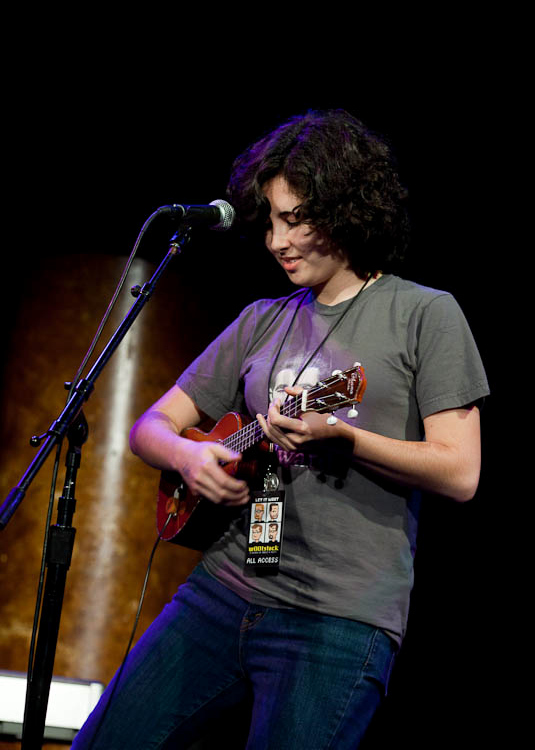
- Lewis performing in 2010

Background information
- Also known as: Sweetafton23
- Born: November 23, 1989 (age 36); California, U.S.
- Origin: Orange County, California, U.S.
- Genres: Acoustic
- Instruments: Ukulele, kazoo, accordion, stylophone, melodica, piano, whistle
- Years active: 2008-present
- Label: DFTBA Records
- Website: mollylewis.wtf

Molly Lewis (also known as Sweetafton23) is an American musician who is known for her ukulele playing and who rose to prominence on the Internet. She plays both covers and original songs. Her original music consists of comedic songs that deal with relevant pop culture topics. She is currently signed with DFTBA Records through which she released her first EP I Made You A CD... But I Eated It.

== History ==
Lewis attracted attention by recording ukulele covers of popular songs such as Britney Spears' "Toxic" and Lady Gaga's "Poker Face", then posting videos of her performances on YouTube. She also recorded videos with other Internet-based musicians, such as 'WadeJohnston', 'thedoifter', and 'doctornoise'. For Mother's Day in 2009, Molly recorded a cover of "Two of Us" by The Beatles as a duet with her mother. Her version of Jonathan Coulton's "Tom Cruise Crazy" was featured on Episode 226 of the UkeCast. Her song "It All Makes Sense At The End" appeared on the creator album from the first VidCon conference in 2010.

She uploads YouTube videos under the name of SweetAfton23, an allusion to a Scottish poet Robert Burns' lyrical poem Sweet Afton. She was inspired by a rendition of Jonathan E. Spilman's 1837 musical accompaniment to the poem, as played by Chris Thile with Nickel Creek. The 23 refers to her birthday, November 23.

== Public appearances ==
She was a regular performer at w00tstock, a traveling variety show that began in 2006, alongside Paul and Storm, Adam Savage, and Wil Wheaton. She has also performed with the Presidents of the United States of America. During live performances, she occasionally forgets to bring key instruments, like the kazoo from "I Pity the Fool", and substitutes other things from her pocket, notably a rape whistle. In an animated music video of "I Pity the Fool", the kazoo solo is shown being played by a cartoon version of Mr. T.

Lewis has appeared on NBC's Los Angeles' show Music LA. She recorded the theme music for Episode 2 of Season 3 of The Legend of Neil. She performed at Jonathan Coulton's first JoCo Cruise in 2011 with John Hodgman, Wil Wheaton, Paul and Storm, Bill Corbett and Kevin Murphy from Mystery Science Theater 3000 and RiffTrax, and Mike Phirman, and remained a regular performer at the event for many years.

On February 22, 2011, Lewis performed her song, "An Open Letter to Stephen Fry", to Stephen Fry himself at Harvard University, during an event marking the Humanist Chaplaincy at Harvard giving its Lifetime Achievement Award to Fry.

In fall of 2012, Lewis toured as a solo act for the first time (outside of w00tstock shows) as part of the "Ladies of Ragnarok" tour with the Doubleclicks, performing 19 concerts in the Northeast and Midwestern United States. In January 2013, Lewis toured the West Coast for the first time, also with the Doubleclicks, performing nine shows in California, Oregon and Washington. Both tours were sponsored by fans who could buy postcards or T-shirts to help the musicians cover costs.

In 2014, Lewis co-wrote a musical with screenwriter Josh A. Cagan titled Thanksgiving vs. Christmas, which was staged live on November 19, 2014, at The Triple Door concert venue in Seattle. The show mimics classic holiday television specials, and features appearances by Joseph Scrimshaw, the Doubleclicks, and others, with Kevin Murphy of Mystery Science Theater 3000 and RiffTrax as Santa Claus. It was recorded and released on CD in 2015.

Starting in 2019, Lewis hosted "The Panalysts", a YouTube web series produced by LoadingReadyRun.

== Awards and achievements ==
Her cover of Coulton's "Tom Cruise Crazy" earned Ukulele Hunt's "Ukulele Video of the Year" for 2007. That video brought her to the attention of Coulton, which led to her opening for him on several occasions.

She won the third edition of Quick Stop Entertainment's Masters of Song Fu competition in 2009, defeating 16 other artists, including Hank Green and Paul and Storm.

== Discography ==
- I Made You a CD, But I Eated It (2009)
- The Same Old Songs, But Live! (2013)
- Thanksgiving Versus Christmas (2015)
- Like & Subscribe (2019)
- Live at Alaska Folk Fest 48 (2023)
