= W00tstock =

Touring variety show

w00tstock
- Dates: October 19, 2009 (v1.0); October 20, 2009 (v1.0.1); October 21, 2009 (v1.1); May 7, 2010 (v2.0); May 8, 2010 (v2.1); June 6, 2010 (v2.2); June 7, 2010 (v2.3); July 22, 2010 (v2.4); September 16, 2010 (v2.5); September 17, 2010 (v2.5.1); October 27, 2010 (v2.6); October 29, 2010 (v2.7); October 31, 2010 (v2.8); November 2, 2010 (v2.9); November 3, 2010 (v2.10); July 21, 2011 (v3.0); July 12, 2012 (v4.0); July 18, 2013 (v5.0); July 24, 2014 (v6.0); July 9, 2015 (v7.0); July 21, 2016 (v8.0)
- Locations: United States: San Francisco, California (v1.0, v1.0.1, v2.5, and v2.5.1); Los Angeles, California (v1.1 and v2.6); Seattle, Washington (v2.0); Portland, Oregon (v2.1); Chicago, Illinois (v2.2); Minneapolis, Minnesota (v2.3); San Diego, California (v2.4, v3.0, v4.0, v5.0, v6.0, v7.0, v8.0); New York City, New York (v2.7); Boston, Massachusetts (v2.8); Austin, Texas (v2.9); Dallas, Texas (v2.10)
- Website: www.w00tstock.net

w00tstock was a touring variety show billed as "3 Hours of Geeks & Music". It was created in 2009 by Wil Wheaton, Adam Savage and Paul and Storm. The first shows took place in 2009 in San Francisco and Los Angeles, and continued until 2016, a total of 21 shows having been presented.

The name is a play on words combining Woodstock, the notable 1969 counterculture music festival, and w00t, an Internet slang word that expresses excitement.

== The versions ==
Though the headliners for the show were Adam Savage, Wil Wheaton, and Paul and Storm, each evening’s performance included a different group of special guests and was subtitled with a different version number.

=== v1.x ===
==== v1.0: Monday, October 19, 2009 ====
Swedish American Music Hall, San Francisco, California

Featuring: Paul and Storm, Adam Savage, and Wil Wheaton. Special guests: Kasper Hauser, Kid Beyond, and Molly Lewis.

==== v1.0.1: Tuesday, October 20, 2009 ====
Swedish American Music Hall, San Francisco, California

Featuring: Paul and Storm, Adam Savage, and Wil Wheaton. Special guests: Kid Beyond, and Molly Lewis.

==== v1.1: Wednesday, October 21, 2009 ====
Largo, Los Angeles, California

Featuring: Paul and Storm, Adam Savage, and Wil Wheaton. Special guests: Josh A. Cagan, Hard 'n Phirm, Jeff Lewis, and Molly Lewis. Special appearances: Felicia Day and Sandeep Parikh.

=== v2.x ===
On November 3, 2009, Wil Wheaton stated in a post on his blog "When we sold out two shows in San Francisco, and only had 20 or so seats left vacant in Los Angeles — where it is notoriously difficult to get people to come out to see shows — we knew that in the future, there will be w00tstock v2.x."

Paul and Storm revealed via their Twitter feed on February 2, 2010, that “w00tstock 2.x is officially in play. Details very soon...”

==== v2.0: Friday, May 7, 2010 ====
Moore Theater, Seattle, Washington

Featuring: Paul and Storm, Adam Savage, and Wil Wheaton. Special guests: Jason Finn, Hank Green, Molly Lewis, LoadingReadyRun, MC Frontalot, and Stephen Toulouse.

==== v2.1: Saturday, May 8, 2010 ====
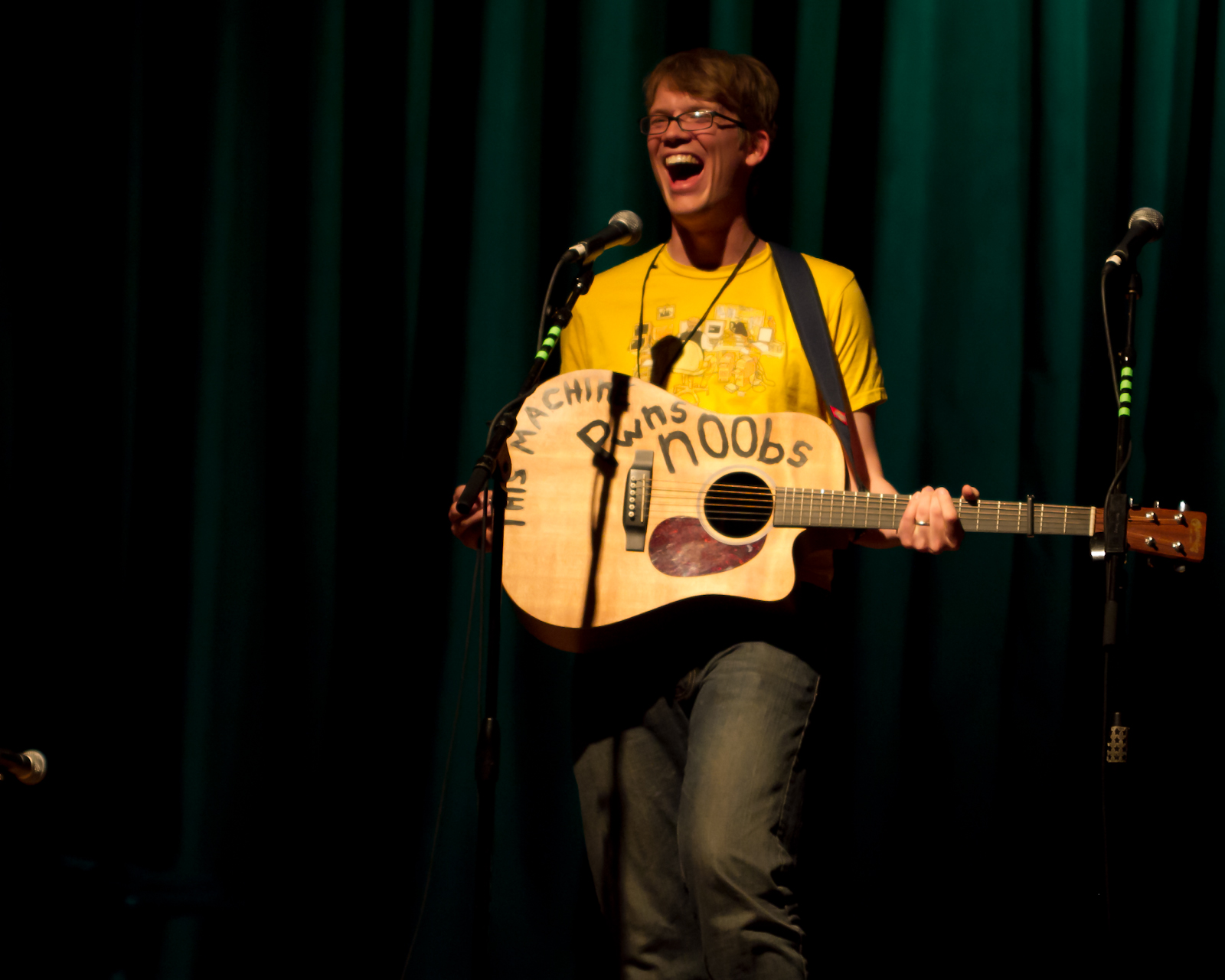
Hank Green performing at The Aladdin Theater in Portland

The Aladdin Theater, Portland, Oregon This show was originally billed as "2.0.1" before the extra 2.x cities were announced.

Featuring: Paul and Storm, Adam Savage, and Wil Wheaton. Special guests: Back Fence PDX, Jason Finn, Matt Fraction, Hank Green, Molly Lewis, LoadingReadyRun, and Stephen Toulouse.

==== v2.2: Sunday, June 6, 2010 ====
Park West, Chicago, Illinois

Featuring: Paul and Storm, Adam Savage, and Wil Wheaton. Special guests: Bill Amend, Trace Beaulieu, Tim Cavanagh, Bill Corbett, Jason Finn, Molly Lewis, Kevin Murphy, Len Peralta, and Peter Sagal.

==== v2.3: Monday, June 7, 2010 ====
The Guthrie Theater, Minneapolis, Minnesota

Featuring: Paul and Storm, Adam Savage, and Wil Wheaton. Special guests: Trace Beaulieu, Tim Bedore, Bill Corbett, Neil Gaiman, Kevin Murphy, Molly Lewis, Len Peralta, Jason Finn and John Scalzi.

==== v2.4: Thursday, July 22, 2010 ====
4th & B, San Diego, California

Scheduled to coincide with the 2010 San Diego Comic-Con.

Featuring: Paul and Storm, Adam Savage, and Wil Wheaton. Special guests: Marian Call, Jason Finn, Matt Fraction, Chris Hardwick, Molly Lewis, Len Peralta, Phil Plait, RiffTrax, Jamy Ian Swiss.

==== v2.5: Thursday, September 16, 2010 ====
The Great American Music Hall, San Francisco, California

Featuring: Paul and Storm, Adam Savage, and Wil Wheaton. Special guests: Bonnie Burton, Jamais Cascio, Jason Finn, Molly Lewis, Mike Phirman.

==== v2.5.1: Friday, September 17, 2010 ====
The Great American Music Hall, San Francisco, California

Featuring: Paul and Storm, Adam Savage, and Wil Wheaton. Special guests: Molly Lewis, Mike Phirman, Phil Plait, Jamy Ian Swiss.

==== v2.6: Wednesday, October 27, 2010 ====
Largo, The Coronet Theater, Los Angeles, California

Featuring: Paul and Storm, Adam Savage, and Chris Hardwick (substituting for Wil Wheaton). Special guests: Garfunkel and Oates, Molly Lewis, Mike Phirman, Eric Schwartz, Maurissa Tancharoen, Jed Whedon. Special appearances by Dr. Demento and Weird Al Yankovic.

==== v2.7: Friday, October 29, 2010 ====
Best Buy Theater, New York City, New York

Featuring: Paul and Storm, Adam Savage, and Jonathan Coulton (substituting for Wil Wheaton). Special guests: Marian Call, Drew Curtis, Jason Finn, Grant Imahara, MC Frontalot.

==== v2.8: Sunday, October 31, 2010 ====
Wilbur Theatre, Boston, Massachusetts

Featuring: Paul and Storm, Adam Savage, and Bill Corbett & Kevin Murphy (both substituting for Wil Wheaton). Special guests: Marian Call, Grant Imahara, Marc Abrahams.

==== v2.9: Tuesday, November 2, 2010 ====
Paramount Theater, Austin, Texas

Featuring: Paul and Storm, Adam Savage, and Neil Gaiman (substituting for Wil Wheaton). Special guests: Bill Amend, Molly Lewis, Jason Finn, Stephen Toulouse, Mary Jo Pehl, Rooster Teeth.

==== v2.10: Wednesday, November 3, 2010 ====
Grenada Theater, Dallas, Texas

Featuring: Paul and Storm, Adam Savage, and Paul F. Tompkins (substituting for Wil Wheaton). Special guests: Bill Amend, Molly Lewis, Jason Finn, Stephen Toulouse.

=== v3.x ===
==== v3.0: Thursday, July 21, 2011 ====
Balboa Theatre, San Diego, California

Scheduled to coincide with the 2011 San Diego Comic-Con.

Featuring: Paul and Storm, Adam Savage, and Wil Wheaton. Special guests: Amy Berg, Ernest Cline, Molly Lewis, RiffTrax, John Roderick, Jason Finn, Mike Phirman

=== v4.x ===
==== v4.0: Thursday, July 12, 2012 ====
Balboa Theater, San Diego, California

Scheduled to coincide with the 2012 San Diego Comic-Con.

Featuring: Paul and Storm, Adam Savage, and Wil Wheaton. Special guests: Bonnie Burton, Marian Call, The Doubleclicks, Rob Reid, John Roderick, Patrick Rothfuss, John Scalzi, Joseph Scrimshaw. Surprise guests: LeVar Burton, Molly Lewis, Grant Imahara.

=== v5.x ===
==== v5.0: Thursday, July 18, 2013 ====
Balboa Theater, San Diego, California

Scheduled to coincide with the 2013 San Diego Comic-Con.

Featuring: Paul and Storm, Adam Savage, and Wil Wheaton. Special guests: Strong Bad, Homestar Runner, Nathan Sawaya, Patrick Rothfuss, Molly Lewis, Jonah Ray, Garfunkel and Oates, Aisha Tyler. Surprise Guests: George RR Martin, Neil Gaiman, Grant Imahara.

=== v6.x ===
==== v6.0: Thursday, July 24, 2014 ====
Balboa Theater, San Diego, California

Scheduled to coincide with the 2014 San Diego Comic-Con.

Featuring: Paul and Storm, Adam Savage, and Wil Wheaton. Special guests: Marian Call, Blind Joe Jeffers, Matthew Inman, Mega Ran, Rob Paulsen, April Winchell. Surprise guests: Cecil Baldwin.

=== v7.x ===
==== v7.0: Thursday, July 9, 2015 ====
Balboa Theater, San Diego California

Scheduled to coincide with the 2015 San Diego Comic-Con.

Featuring: Paul and Storm, Adam Savage, and Wil Wheaton. Special guests: Molly Quinn, Phil Plait, Uke Box Heroes (Miracle Laurie and Christopher May), Patrick Rothfuss, Alton Brown. Surprise guests: Cecil Baldwin, Alison Haislip, Yuri Lowenthal, Laura Bailey. Finale guests: Greg Benson, Marian Call, The Doubleclicks, Molly Lewis, Hal Lublin, Joseph Scrimshaw, Anne Wheaton.

=== v8.x ===
==== v8.0: Thursday, July 21, 2016 ====
Balboa Theater, San Diego California

Scheduled to coincide with the 2016 San Diego Comic-Con.

Featuring: Paul and Storm and Adam Savage. Special guests: Joel Hodgson, Cameron Esposito, Hank Green, Travis McElroy, Rebecca Watson. Surprise guests: River Butcher, Marian Call, Andrea Datzman, Michael Giacchino, Hal Lublin, David Silverman. Finale guests: Drew Curtis, Patrick Rothfuss.
