= Stephen Toulouse =

American policy specialist and public relations manager

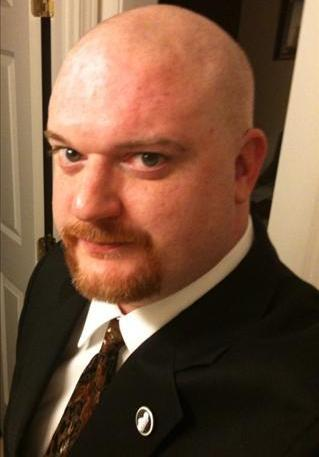
- Toulouse in 2009
- Born: August 1972
- Died: October 26, 2017 (aged 45); Seattle, Washington
- Other name: Stepto
- Occupations: Former Director of Xbox Live Policy and Enforcement, Former Co-host of "Major Nelson Radio"
- Known for: Xbox Live Policy and Enforcement
- Website: www.stepto.com

Stephen Toulouse (August 1972 – October 26, 2017), also known as Stepto, was an American policy specialist and public relations manager who served as the Director of Xbox LIVE Policy and Enforcement at Microsoft. He frequently represented Microsoft and Xbox Live in various media, including on Larry Hryb's "Major Nelson Radio" Xbox-related podcast, to discuss security and policy issues.

Prior to joining the Xbox team at Microsoft, Toulouse was the head of communications for security response with the Microsoft Security Response Center.

== Career ==
Toulouse worked at Microsoft starting in April 1994. On February 3, 2012, he announced his departure from Microsoft, stating:

"... This is a positive thing. I have nothing but confidence in the future of Microsoft and specifically Xbox and Xbox Live ..."

=== Microsoft Security Response Center ===
Toulouse joined the Microsoft Security Response Center (MSRC) in November 2002. His first exposure to communications during a security response crisis was during the spread of the SQL Slammer computer worm in January 2003, where he was asked by Security Business Unit Vice President Mike Nash to handle creating a way for affected users to determine whether or not they had a vulnerable instance of SQL Server installed.

Toulouse later handled public relations for malware outbreaks such as Blaster, Sasser, and Zotob, as well as the Windows Metafile vulnerability.

Toulouse suggested in a personal blog entry in 2006 that Apple's products enjoyed good security due to their small market share and that the company would have to focus on hiring a "Security Czar" at some point.

When Toulouse left the MSRC, he was praised by several notable security journalists for his candor and honesty about Microsoft's security challenges.

=== Xbox Live ===
In August 2007, Toulouse joined the Xbox Live Services group as Lead Program Manager for Enforcement, describing his role at the time as "Helping to make sure the Live experience is a safe and enjoyable one for users." Over the next years he expanded his role to include policy and enforcement for the Xbox Live and Zune Social services, building out a team of worldwide "enforcers" to implement the rules of the Xbox Live service. Toulouse was promoted to Director for Policy and Enforcement for Xbox LIVE in September 2009.

During his time as a co-host of the Xbox podcast "Major Nelson Radio," Toulouse was the public face for the rules governing behavior on the Xbox Live service and often explained and clarified policies.

==== Sexuality identification on Xbox Live ====
In February 2009, while Toulouse was head of policy for Xbox Live, Microsoft attracted adverse attention for the gaming service's policies towards members' expression of their sexual identity. While the service allows for self-expression of sexual orientation in voice chat during games, at that time Xbox Live banned all mention of orientation — including of heterosexuality — in Gamertags and in profiles. Widespread criticism of this practice led to Toulouse publicly vowing to change the policy to allow for expression of sexual orientation. Changes announced in March 2010 permit Xbox Live members to express sexual orientation in their Gamertags and profiles. The Gay and Lesbian Alliance Against Defamation (GLAAD) praised Toulouse for his work with their group in combating homophobia in online gaming.

== Performances ==
Toulouse was a special guest at w00tstock 2.0 in Seattle, Washington and w00tstock 2.1 in Portland, Oregon. He read from "The Book of Enforcement".

He also provided security for the King/Queen of the Sea for both Joco Cruise Crazy 1 (2011) and Joco Cruise Crazy 2 (2012) as the founding member of "Stepto's Army".

== Death ==
Stephen died of an abdominal hemorrhage. His family announced that he had died on October 27, 2017.
