= Len Peralta =

American cartoonist

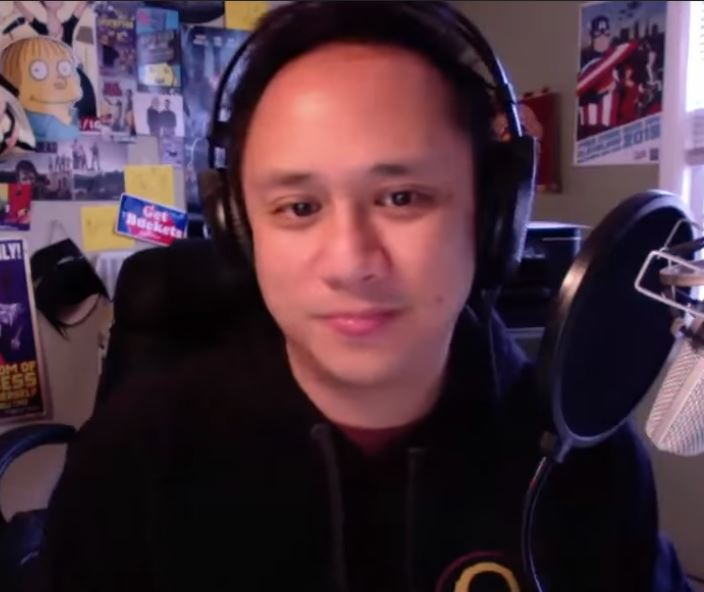
- Len Peralta in 2018
- Born: North Royalton, Ohio
- Known for: Cartoonist, Illustrator, Caricaturist
- Notable work: Geek A Week, Jawbone Radio (podcast), CreatureGeek (podcast) Daily Tech News Show (contributor)
- Website: http://www.lenperalta.com/

Len Peralta is a Cleveland-area graphic artist, illustrator, cartoonist, and podcaster who is known for zombie-themed caricatures and collaborations with nerd celebrities.

His Geek a Week project, which involves weekly podcast interviews over the course of a year of fifty-two influential geeks and the creation of collectible trading cards featuring original artwork depicting the interview subjects, is nearing completion, and the first batch of cards is available through ThinkGeek.

Previous projects include illustrations of the books There's a Zombie in my Treehouse by Ken Plume and John Robinson and Silly Rhymes for Belligerent Children by Trace Beaulieu and for a guest artist edition of Star Munchkin by Steve Jackson Games. He has also been involved in several w00tstock performances, drawing commemorative poster art on stage during the performance.
