= Harmony Sweepstakes A Cappella Festival =

Coordinates: 38°0′8″N 122°32′0″W

The Harmony Sweepstakes A Cappella Festival is an annual showcase and competition for a cappella groups of all vocal styles. The annual event began in San Rafael, California, and is organized into seven regional events across the United States, with each winning group advancing to the National Finals in San Francisco, California.

== About ==
Highlighting performances by hundreds of up and coming vocal groups from around the country, The Harmony Sweepstakes A Cappella Festival begins the season with regional competitions in seven major urban markets during the spring months, followed by the National Finals held in early May. The cities of New York, Boston, Los Angeles, Washington DC, Portland/Seattle, San Francisco, and Chicago have each sent a winning vocal group to perform in the National Finals, vying for the Grand National Champion.

Called "the granddaddy of all the singing contests" for vocal harmony groups, The Harmony Sweepstakes embraces all styles of music performed a cappella, from the traditional forms of doo-wop and barbershop, gospel, and jazz to contemporary vocal harmony. The festival "has helped to legitimize a cappella singing, once dismissed as a vocal novelty act associated with guys in straw hats singing barbershop harmonies."

=== Partial list of winners ===
- 2025: Smoke Ring
- 2024: Remedy
- 2023: Radius
- 2022: Highline
- 2018: Business Casual
- 2016: Stiletta
