= Rosie Cross =

Australian Internet publisher

Rosie Cross (born Britain 1958) is an Australian Internet publisher, best known as the founder of Geekgirl, a popular Australian magazine and website that began in 1993.

== Biography ==
Rosie Cross received a bachelor's degree of communications/journalism from Mitchell College of Advanced Education, Bathurst in 1986. She initially worked as a freelance radio producer and writer. She mainly wrote about the Internet culture and how it was shifting. She did programs about the same topic that were broadcast on ABC. Rosie then created the first ever cyber-feminist e-zine (Geekgirl). She has appeared in Wired and Australian magazines such as 21•C magazine.

With the website Geekgirl Rosie combined her interests in print, radio, and video. She promoted the idea that women now had technology tools to achieve new possibilities that they could not achieve before. She also believed the opportunities for women were greater. To her, the World Wide Web was the start of a new beginning for women.

== Recognition ==
Her work has been archived by a number of museums, including the National Museum of Australia 101 extraordinary Australians.
