= Bonnie Burton =

American author, journalist, comedian, actress, and show host

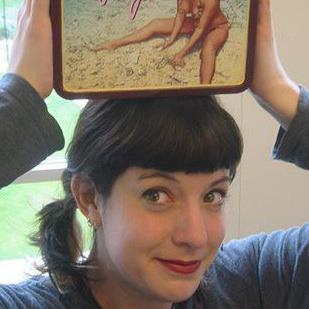
- Born: July 12, 1972 (age 54); Dodge City, Kansas, U.S.
- Education: University of Colorado Boulder (BA, BS)
- Occupations: Writer; Journalist; Comedian
- Years active: 1995–present
- Website: GRRL.com

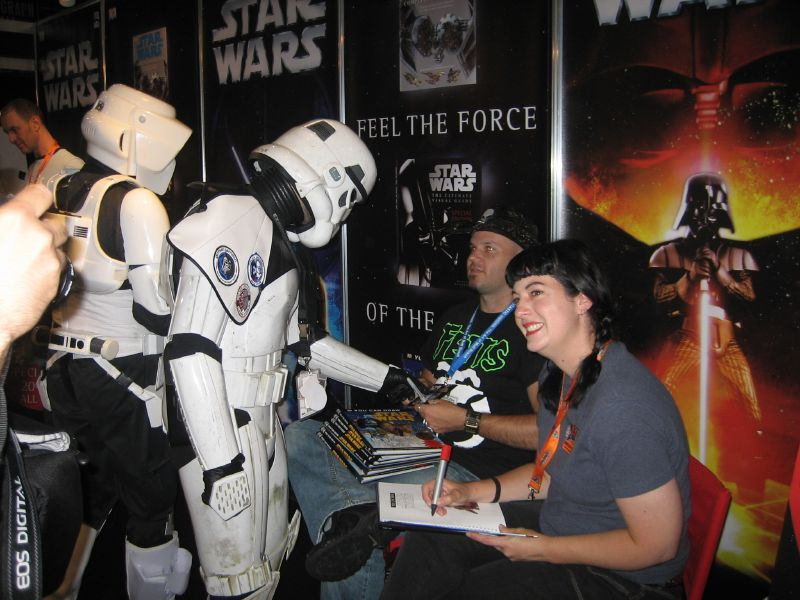
Burton and Matt Busch signing their book You Can Draw: Star Wars for members of the German Garrison of the 501st Legion at Star Wars Celebration Europe in July 2007

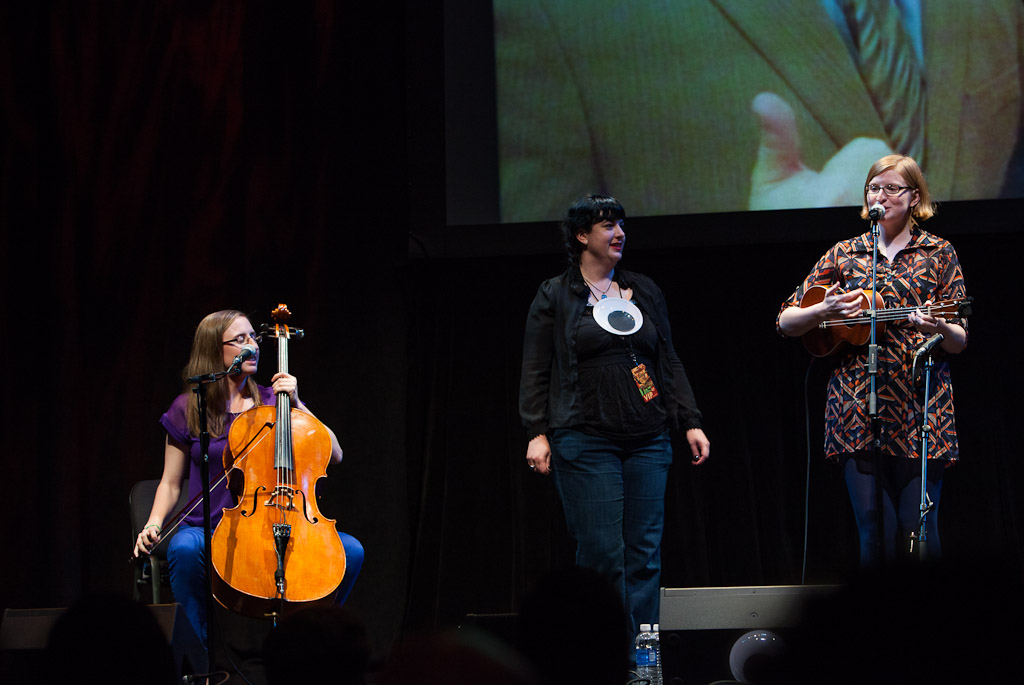
Burton on stage with The Doubleclicks at w00tstock 4.0 in 2012

Bonnie Burton (born July 12, 1972) is a San Francisco-based author, journalist, comedian, actress, and show host. She is best known for arts & crafts books like The Star Wars Craft Book, and appearances on web series including Geek DIY on Stan Lee's World of Heroes YouTube channel, Ask Bonnie, Wil Wheaton's TableTop, and Felicia Day's Vaginal Fantasy Book Club. She is the former Senior Editor and Social Media Strategist at StarWars.com for Lucasfilm and was staff writer for Star Wars Insider magazine for 10 years. She works as a freelance writer with a specialty in writing about topics for young child and teen audiences.

== Early life ==
Burton was born and raised on a farm in Dodge City, Kansas, to a mom who was a librarian and a father who was a farmer and animal medical salesman.

Influenced by both the rural area and activities of her childhood like Sunday School, 4-H, and kindergarten—and supported by her mom who let her convert her playroom into a craft room—Burton created arts and crafts projects from the time she was young, cultivating a lifelong passion for making things. Burton also started writing as a young girl. At seven years of age, after a poem about the town was published in the Canadian paper, The Western Producer, she began submitting her writing to essay contests, which she often won. During college Burton did a lot of do it yourself self-publishing through an active blog called GRRL, arts & crafts, and things like chapbooks.

In 1995, Burton received a dual degree (B.A./B.S.) in English and Journalism from the University of Colorado Boulder. She also served as Program Director at Boulder's college radio station, KUCB.

== Career ==
=== Writing ===
While in college Burton worked as a writer and editor at Campus Press, a student newspaper that later became the CU Independent. During her time there, the Campus Press began publishing content online, which was a new method for delivering news at the time. Burton also wrote for the Digit newsletter and did freelance writing for publications like Wired. During and after college in Boulder, she worked as a freelance editor at Apple's fledgling eWorld website.

After college, Burton decided to follow the dot-com era and moved from Colorado to San Francisco. In between various positions, Burton continued to write for publications that included Wired, Craft, Bust, Geek Monthly, SFX, CNET, and Playboy.

In 1996, Burton worked a senior web editor at @Home Network, which became Excite@Home, then as a website editor for AOL's Winamp music player. From 2003 to 2012, Burton worked at Lucasfilm where she was Senior Editor and Social Media Strategist at StarWars.com for Lucasfilm.

While at Lucasfilm she was also a staff writer for Star Wars Insider magazine. In 2007, Burton contributed a chapter to the sequential art anthology, The Girls' Guide to Guys' Stuff: An Anthology of Comics by Women for Friends of Lulu called "A Star Wars Fan Boy Field Guide."

Burton was an early adopter of blog writing, publishing a personal blog called Grrl.com since before April 1996. As an author, Burton got her start creating collection of new-to-the-time blogs, co-editing the 2004 book Never Threaten To Eat Your Co-Workers: Best of Blogs with Alan Graham for Apress. With a foreword by techblogger Doc Searls, Never Threaten is a cross-section collection of this new form of writing online accompanied by interviews with the bloggers that provide context to the writing.

Starting with 2007's You Can Draw: Star Wars Characters for DK Publishing (illustrated by Tom Hodges and Matt Busch), Burton began publishing drawing tutorial books focused on a long-time passion for arts & crafts, providing tips, tracings, fold out pages and stencils to help readers draw a range of characters from the Star Wars universe. In 2009, she published Draw: Star Wars: The Clone Wars for Klutz Press which includes instructions to teaching readers how to draw 20 different Clone Wars characters.

For 2011's The Star Wars Craft Book, Burton used her Twitter feed as a way of getting feedback from Star Wars fans on details of the characters. The book includes craft project tutorials to create Chewbacca sock puppets, Jabba the Hutt body pillows, Ewok flower vases, All Terrain Armored Transport (AT-AT) herb gardens. Projects originated from craft posts Burton wrote on StarWars.com from 2004 onwards on a weekly and then monthly basis, with the best projects selected for the book.

2009's Girls Against Girls: Why We Are Mean to Each Other and How We Can Change, Burton discusses the issue of bullying and abuse between girls, including its causes and advice on how to cope. Burton outlines the physical and chemical explanations for mood swings that can cause seemingly irrational behavior in teenage girls and offers advice for managing relationships with 'mean girls.' Burton shares how readers can recognize these habits and behaviors in themselves and make changes to improve their relationships and stop perpetuating the cycle. The book draws upon interviews with Go-Gos guitarist Jane Wiedlin, Mystery Science Theater 3000 writer and actress Mary Jo Pehl, tattoo artist Hannah Aitchison, Tegan Quin of the band Tegan and Sara, artist Elizabeth McGrath and singer/artist Jessicka from the bands Jack Off Jill and Scarling.

2010's Star Wars, the Clone Wars: Planets in Peril for DK Publishing focuses on the newest worlds from the Clone Wars universe, and how they are being affected by fighting. 2016's Crafting with Feminism: 25 Girl-Powered Projects to Smash the Patriarchy includes craft projects that are focused on empowering young girls and features a foreword by Felicia Day.

In October 2017, Burton released the book, J.K. Rowling's Wizarding World: Movie Magic Volume Three: Amazing Artifacts.

=== Television ===
From 1994 through 1996, Burton hosted the Denver alternative music video program "Teletunes" (on PBS affiliate KBDI-TV/Channel 12). After moving to San Francisco, she hosted the San Francisco music video show "Subculture."

Burton created, produces and hosts a comedy show called Geek DIY on Stan Lee's World of Heroes YouTube channel. In this show she crafts with her guests, who have in the past included Grant Imahara, members of Team Unicorn, Wil Wheaton, Clare Kramer, Javier Grillo-Marxuach, Robin Thorsen, America Young and more.

Burton co-hosts the Vaginal Fantasy Romance Book Club Show on the Geek & Sundry YouTube Channel, along with Felicia Day, Veronica Belmont and Kiala Kazbee. In this show, she and her co-hosts discuss and critique romance novels.

Burton has appeared twice on Wil Wheaton's show TableTop. In 2012, she appeared on a two part episode to play the role-playing game, Fiasco; in 2015 she played Geek Out!.

Burton guest starred in the "Social Traumas" episode of Felicia Day's show The Guild.

She also starred with Andy Richter and Brendan Coyle in the animated short Batman: Year Minus Two by comedy writer Rob Kutner.

=== Additional work ===
Burton is a long-time fan of Bettie Page. In 1990, during her freshman year of college, Burton was at a comic book store and a clerk there she was friendly with told her she looked like Bettie Page, who Burton didn't know anything about. She quickly learned more and went on to compete in look-alike contests and created a website in homage to Page called The Bettie Page. During the 1990s, as a continuation of her interest in Page and the subculture and images she portrayed, Burton performed with the fetish performance dance and club kid troupe called Uzi, which was part of the community of the fetish store of the same name in Denver.

In 2010, Burton performed at Writers with Drinks. In 2011, Burton appeared in Wil Wheaton's geek variety show w00tstock in San Francisco and San Diego. In 2016, she performed at SF Sketchfest.

== Personal life ==
A long-time resident of San Francisco, Burton moved to Los Angeles in 2018 where she now resides. In August 2010, Burton married R2-D2 at Star Wars Celebration V.

== Filmography ==
TV and web series

- 1998: Ask Bonnie – Producer, Director, Writer, Host
- 2011: The Guild – Episode: "Social Traumas"
- 2012: Geek DIY (Stan Lee's World of Heroes) – Producer, Writer, Host (12 episodes)
- 2012: TableTop (Geek & Sundry) – "Fiasco, Part 1 & 2"
- 2012–2016: Vaginal Fantasy Book Club – Writer, Host (54 episodes)
- 2014–2016: CNET CraveCast – Host (20 episodes)
- 2015: TableTop (Geek & Sundry) – "Geek Out"

== Honors and leadership ==
- 2007: Inducted as an Honorary Member of the 501st Legion of Imperial Stormtroopers by the League of Extraordinary Troopers
- 2009: Wired – 100 Geeks You Should Be Following On Twitter
- 2017: SYFY Advisory Council

== Works and publications ==
- Burton, Bonnie (1990). "#1: Premiere Grrl; #2: Evil Kids & Halloween; #3: Santa Vs. Satan; #4: Puppets; #5: Drag Queens; #6: Sex; #7: Lucha Libre; #8: Alice in Wonderland" (Zine). GRRL. San Francisco, Calif: Grrl Enterprises. OCLC 467952014.
- Graham, Alan; Burton, Bonnie, eds. (2004). Never Threaten to Eat Your Co-Workers: Best of Blogs. Berkeley, CA: Apress. ISBN 978-1-4302-0678-1-. OCLC 883383589.
- Burton, Bonnie (2006). "Cool Trooper: The Star Wars Art of Nathan Cabrera". Star Wars Insider. 90. IDG Entertainment. ISSN 1041-5122.
- Burton, Bonnie (2006). "Star Wars Goes to School". Star Wars Insider. 90. IDG Entertainment. ISSN 1041-5122.
- Burton, Bonnie (2007). "Best of StarWars.com: Darren Hayes: Singing Star Wars' Praises". Star Wars Insider. 94. Titan Magazines. ISSN 1041-5122.
- Burton, Bonnie (2007). "Best of StarWars.com: Kaiser Chiefs: I Predict An Intergalactic Riot". Star Wars Insider. 95. Titan Magazines. ISSN 1041-5122.
- Burton, Bonnie; Busch, Matthew Stuart; Hodges, Tom (2007). You Can Draw: Star Wars Characters. London: Dorling Kindersley (DK Publishing, Inc.). ISBN 978-0-7566-2343-2. OCLC 156707625.
- Burton, Bonnie (2007). "A Star Wars Fan Boy Field Guide". In Friends of Lulu (ed.). The Girls' Guide to Guys' Stuff: An Anthology of Comics by Women. New York: Friends of Lulu. ISBN 978-0-9740960-2-5. OCLC 173079053.
- Burton, Bonnie; Klutz, Inc. (2009). Draw: Star Wars: The Clone Wars. Palo Alto, CA: Klutz. ISBN 978-1-59174-698-0. OCLC 316034399.
- Burton, Bonnie (2009). Girls Against Girls Why We Are Mean to Each Other and How We Can Change. San Francisco: Zest Books. ISBN 978-0-9790173-6-0. OCLC 849738949.
- Burton, Bonnie (2010). Star Wars, the Clone Wars: Planets in Peril. London: DK (Dorling Kindersley readers, 4). ISBN 978-0-7566-6690-3. OCLC 809219290.
- Burton, Bonnie (2011). The Star Wars Craft Book. New York: Random House. ISBN 978-0-345-51116-4. OCLC 496956779.
- Burton, Bonnie (2012). "Team Bonnie". In Nocenti, Ann; D' Errico, Camilla; De Liz, Renae (eds.). Womanthology: Heroic. San Diego, Calif.: IDW. ISBN 978-1-61377-147-1. OCLC 757931802.
- Burton, Bonnie; Hickman, Jessica; Deering, Rachel (2013). De Liz, Renae; Eisinger, Justin; Simon, Alonzo (eds.). Womanthology: Space. San Diego, Calif.: IDW. ISBN 978-1-61377-607-0. OCLC 936438930.
- Burton, Bonnie (2016). Crafting with Feminism: 25 Girl-Powered Projects to Smash the Patriarchy. Quirk Books. ISBN 978-1-59474-927-8. OCLC 933420535.
- Burton, Bonnie (2017). J.K. Rowling's Wizarding World: Movie Magic Volume Three: Amazing Artifacts. New York NY: Penguin Random House. ISBN 978-0-763-69584-2. OCLC 983050069.
