= Paul and Storm =

American comedic musical duo

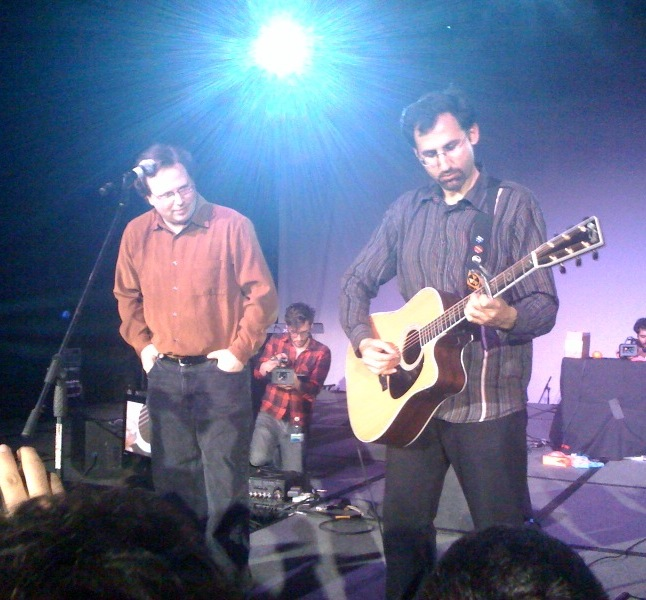
- Paul and Storm at PAX 09

Background information
- Origin: Arlington, Virginia, United States
- Genres: Comedy rock, comedy
- Years active: 2004–present
- Label: Bulletproof Artist Management
- Spinoff of: Da Vinci's Notebook
- Members: Paul Sabourin; Greg "Storm" DiCostanzo
- Website: http://paulandstorm.com

Paul and Storm are an American, Arlington, Virginia-based comedic musical duo, consisting of Paul Sabourin and Greg "Storm" DiCostanzo. They are best known for their humorous songs about geek culture and for amassing an internet fan base.

They are favorites of Dr. Demento and regular radio guests on The Bob and Tom Show. They tour regularly with Jonathan Coulton, singing backup vocals for a number of his songs. Coulton has also appeared on stage to do backup for Paul and Storm's songs.

== History ==
=== Formation ===
For twelve years Sabourin and DiCostanzo were one half of the a cappella comedy band Da Vinci's Notebook, but in 2004 the band stopped touring and regular performances, so the two struck out on their own with Paul playing keyboard and penny whistle and Storm on the guitar.

=== Albums ===
Before releasing an official debut album Paul and Storm released a demo EP of songs that would eventually be re-recorded for their debut album Opening Band, as well as other songs that have yet to be re-recorded. The EP was titled Shame and Cookie Dough.

In 2005, the duo released Opening Band, their first album release. The title stems from the lead track off the album, an idea thought up by Storm after their experience as being the opening act. While they mainly perform live as a duo, they had the help of many guest musicians on the album, including Mike Clem and Eddie Hartness of Eddie from Ohio and Valerie Vigoda, Brendon Milburn, and Gene Lewin from Groovelily. Groovelily performed as Paul and Storm's back-up band at the 2005 Falcon Ridge Folk Festival. The album features a number of "Rejected Commercial Jingles" as well as a commentary track for two of the album's songs.

Their second album News to Us was recorded week by week for The Bob and Tom Show as a featured weekly news segment. Many of the tracks on the album feature the radio hosts introducing each song; also there is the audible trademark Bob and Tom laughter on the tracks dubbed as the "On-Air" versions. At the end of the album, the duo placed the studio version of most of the tracks as well so that listeners could have a more traditional album experience. The song "Your Love Is" on the album was co-written by Jonathan Coulton.

In 2007 their third studio album Gumbo Pants was released. This album features their fan favorite, and often live concert closing track "The Captain's Wife's Lament" as well as other fan favorites such as "Count to Ten" and "A Better Version of You". It also featured a number of very short tracks that were titled "One Sentence Songs" and more "Rejected Commercial Jingles".

In 2010 after a three-year lapse between albums, the duo released their fourth studio album Do You Like Star Wars?. The album is a collection of songs that the duo had released one by one in the years following Gumbo Pants. It includes concert favorites such as "Nun Fight", "Cruel, Cruel Moon", and "Frogger! The Frogger Musical!". A number of the songs released on this album were written for Quick Stop Entertainment's Masters of Song Fu contest.

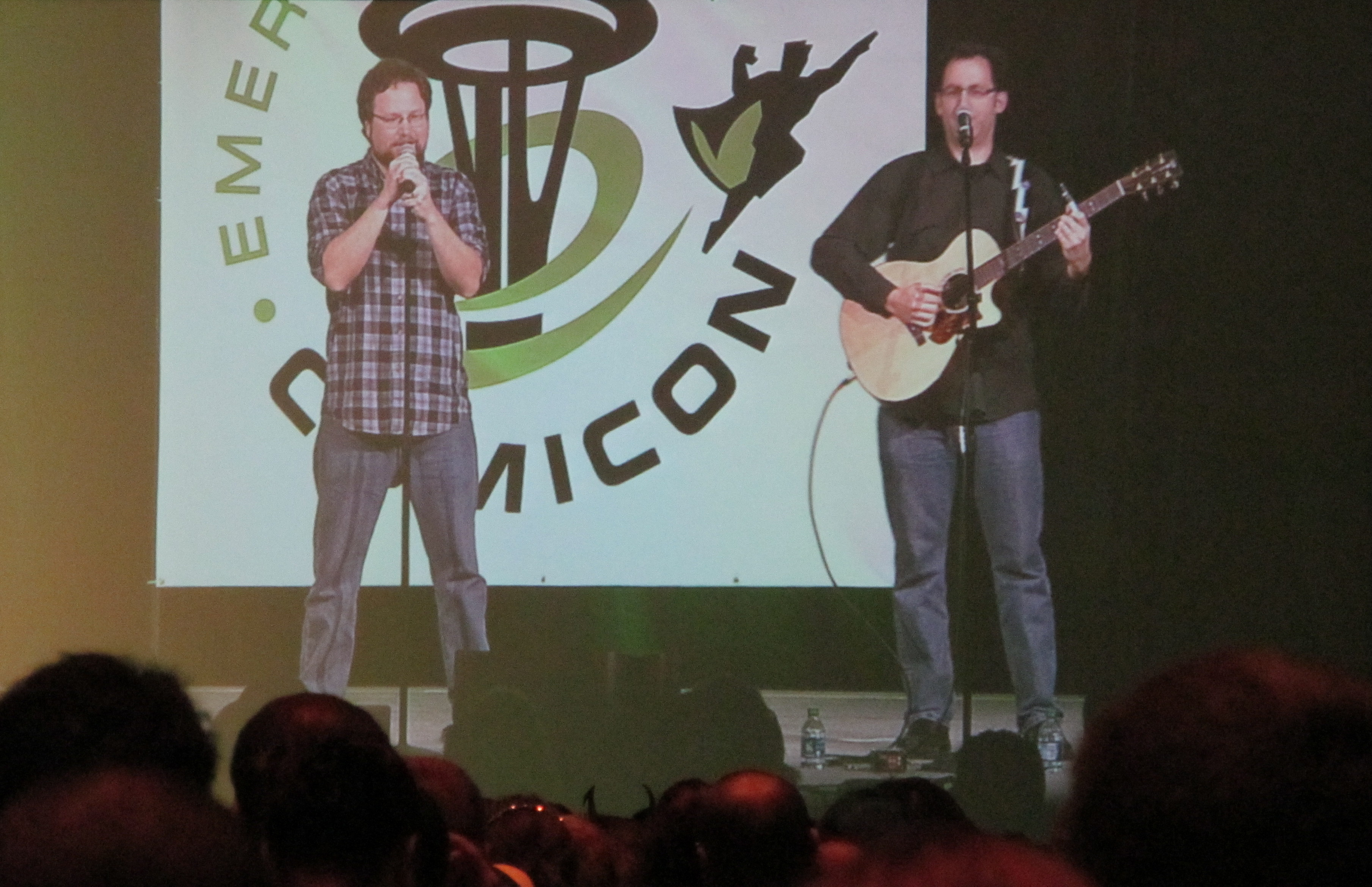
Paul and Storm in 2013

At the end of 2013, they successfully crowdfunded a project in support of their new album, BALL PIT.

=== Live shows ===
Paul and Storm have toured all around the United States as well as in Canada and the United Kingdom. They frequently tour alongside Jonathan Coulton, usually opening up the shows, and also providing backing vocals for a number of songs in Coulton's set.

As part of their tour, they opened for Coulton's act at PAX in Seattle. In November 2009, they toured the United Kingdom alongside Coulton.

=== Other projects ===
The duo has a weekly audio talk show podcast, Paul and Storm Talk About Some Stuff for Five to Ten Minutes (On Average). On the podcast the two will often talk about food, live shows, and upcoming projects.

In 2009, in conjunction with Wil Wheaton and Adam Savage, Paul and Storm organized a series of music and comedy shows called w00tstock, which began in late October of that year. The events took place around the United States and were billed as "3 hours of Geeks and Music".

In mid-2010 the duo created two separate internet memes via Twitter. In late July, Storm started the popular internet meme of WookieeLeaks by using the hashtag #wookieeleaks on Twitter. The meme is a play on the then-recent WikiLeaks publishing of secret government files. Within these tweets a person will mention a secret leaked from the Star Wars universe. Following the success of the hashtag Storm was interviewed by Wired and NPR. Less than a week after the success of WookieeLeaks, Paul created the #kanyenewyorkertweets hashtag via Twitter. Within the tweets where this hashtag is used a person will link to a cartoon from The New Yorker with a tweet from Kanye West added as text below the image. Following its success the meme was picked up by The Onion, Paste Magazine, the Huffington Post, and The New Yorker itself.

In October 2010, they were musical guests on the online MMO AQWorlds, in an event that celebrated the second birthday of the game.

Paul and Storm co-created and starred in the webseries "Learning Town" on the Geek and Sundry channel YouTube channel. The show was created and written by the duo and head writer Josh A. Cagan. The duo plays fictional versions of themselves, who are offered the job of hosting Storm's favorite kids' show after the original beloved host dies. The show also stars Bresha Webb as their producer and Mike Phirman as their biggest-fan-turned-puppeteer. Guest stars on the series included James Urbaniak, Greg Benson, Maurissa Tancharoen, Jeff Lewis, Michael Buckley, and Weird Al Yankovic.

On January 17, 2013, Paul and Storm appeared on Wil Wheaton's web series Tabletop on Geek & Sundry.

The duo have contributed to the Homestar Runner series of web cartoons, writing the songs "The Ballad of the Sneak" and "Theme from Stinkoman" for the website.

Paul and Storm were hired by Joel Hodgson as writers and composers on the 2017 revival of Mystery Science Theater 3000.

Paul Sabourin is also the tour manager for the podcast My Brother, My Brother and Me.

== Discography ==
=== Studio albums ===
- Opening Band (2005)
- News to Us (2006)
- Gumbo Pants (2007)
- Do You Like Star Wars? (2010)
- Ball Pit (2014)

=== Other releases ===
- Shame and Cookie Dough (Demo EP) (2005)
- The 25 Days of Newman (Randy Newman-style Themes) (2008)
- It Might Be Xmas (Holiday-themed They Might Be Giants-style EP) (2009)
