= Marian Call =

American singer-songwriter

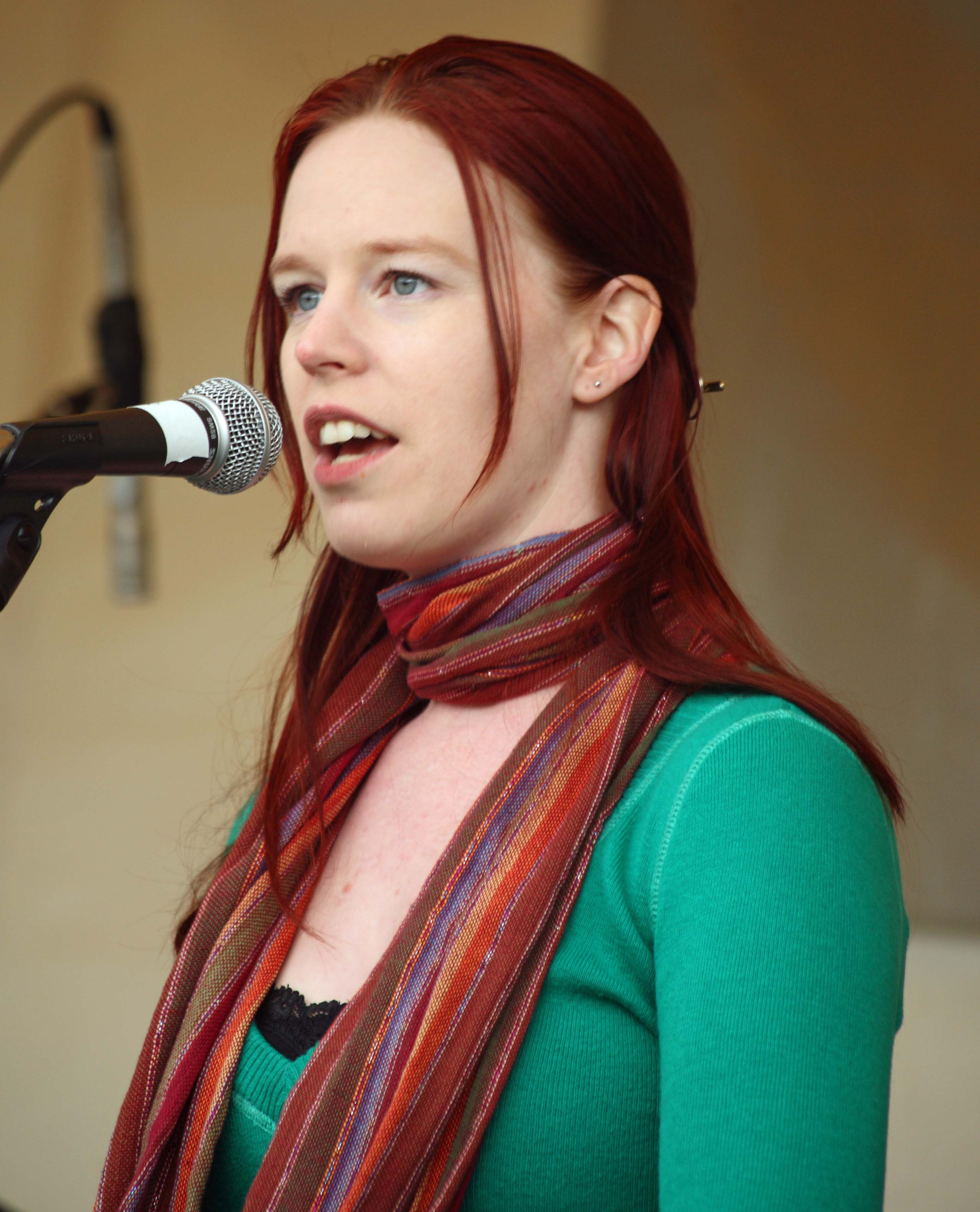
- Performing at the KSKA Day picnic in 2011

Background information
- Born: February 24, 1982 (age 44)
- Origin: Gig Harbor, Washington, U.S.
- Genre: Contemporary folk
- Occupation: Singer-songwriter
- Instruments: Vocals, typewriter, rainstick, keyboards, bass
- Years active: 2007–present
- Website: mariancall.com

Marian Call (born February 24, 1982, in Gig Harbor, Washington) is an American singer-songwriter based in Juneau, Alaska.

Call is known for her songs containing themes of geek culture, as well as her rise to popularity through the use of the Internet and social networking.

== Career ==
Call graduated from Stanford University in 2004 with a bachelor's degree in composition and vocal performance. She relocated to Alaska, where she spent two years waiting tables, learning the craft of songwriting. Inspired by the commentary track for the Firefly episode "Objects in Space", she wrote the song "Dark Dark Eyes" and shortly after booked three days in a studio to record what would become her first album, Vanilla, initially a side-project for family, friends, and small Alaskan audiences. However, when fans discovered some of her early tracks on her MySpace page, she realized she was accumulating a fan base.

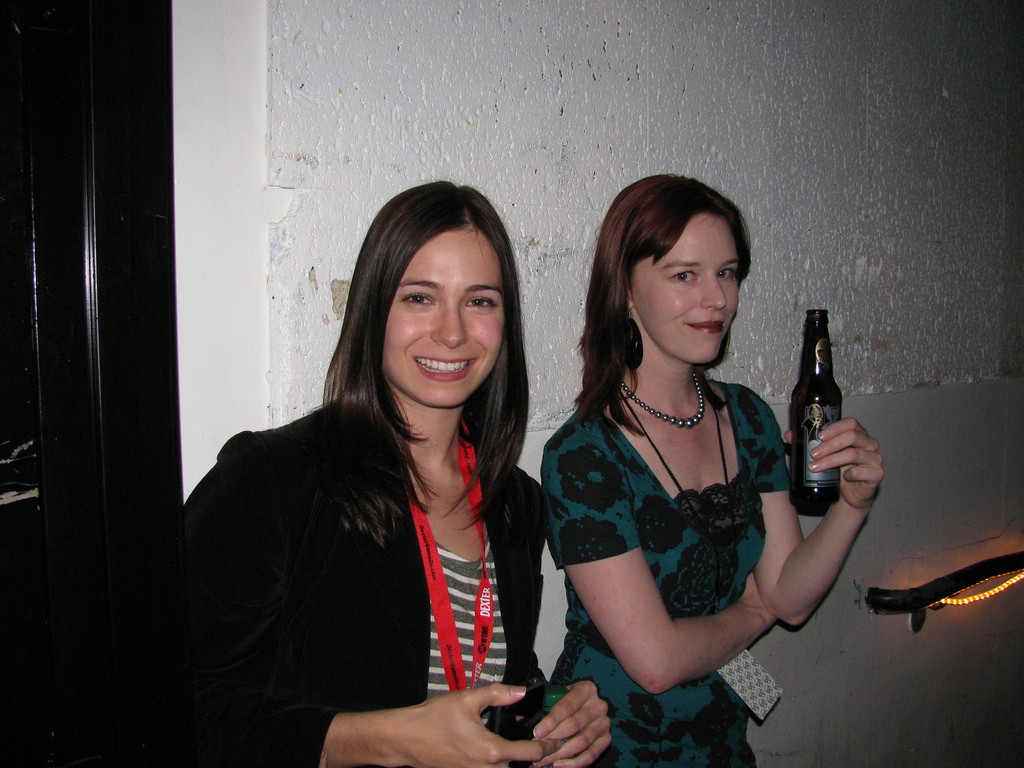
Call with Veronica Belmont at ComicCon 2010.

One of the events that led to Call's accumulating fan-base came after she entered and won the Sing a Song of Saffron contest. The contest was held by a fan blog for the television series Firefly, and Call won with her song "It Was Good for You, Too". One of the judges of the contest was Christina Hendricks, who portrayed the character of Saffron, and had this to say about her winning entry, "She sounded just like me! It was fantastic, I really thought it was a good song even if you don't know the character."

In February 2008, Call announced that she would be going on tour for the first time, playing at venues in California and Texas. Nine months of her tour (June 2008 – March 2009) were spent on bus, which she named the Millennium Tortoise, traveling between the Western US and Canada, before returning home to Anchorage in July 2009 to begin work on her album, Something Fierce.

Before starting her tour, Call started the Song of the Month Project, a project that she continued while touring. This project lasted for twelve months and included songs such as the tongue-in-cheek "I Wish I Were a Real Alaskan Girl" and "We're Out for Blood", a song commissioned by the creator of the film Zombie Cheerleading Camp.

In November 2008 Call was commissioned again, this time for a full-length album, by the science-fiction prop replica company Quantum Mechanix and Black Market Beagles. The album, titled Got to Fly, was Call's first record deal, as well as the first and only album under the Quantum Mechanix label. The songs on the album reflect several aspects of geek culture, with such songs as "I'll Still Be a Geek After Nobody Thinks It's Chic" as well as songs inspired by the television series Firefly and Battlestar Galactica. In 2017, the TV series Chance (TV series) used her song "Stop What You're Doing" for the closing credits of a second-season episode.

While primarily a vocalist, she occasionally uses a typewriter for percussion as well the remains of her cat Zippy which are stored in a small tin. She also performs at concerts using a rainstick, which she had autographed by Nathan Fillion and Alan Tudyk, two actors in the television series Firefly.

=== Donors' Circle ===
In March 2009, Call announced the Donors' Circle, a way for fans of her music to invest in her, not for any financial return, but the return being the art itself. Members of the Donors' Circle have access to several raw samples of music from her upcoming album Something Fierce as well the opportunity to interact with Marian directly, and to give her feedback on the progress of the album.

=== 49>50 Tour ===
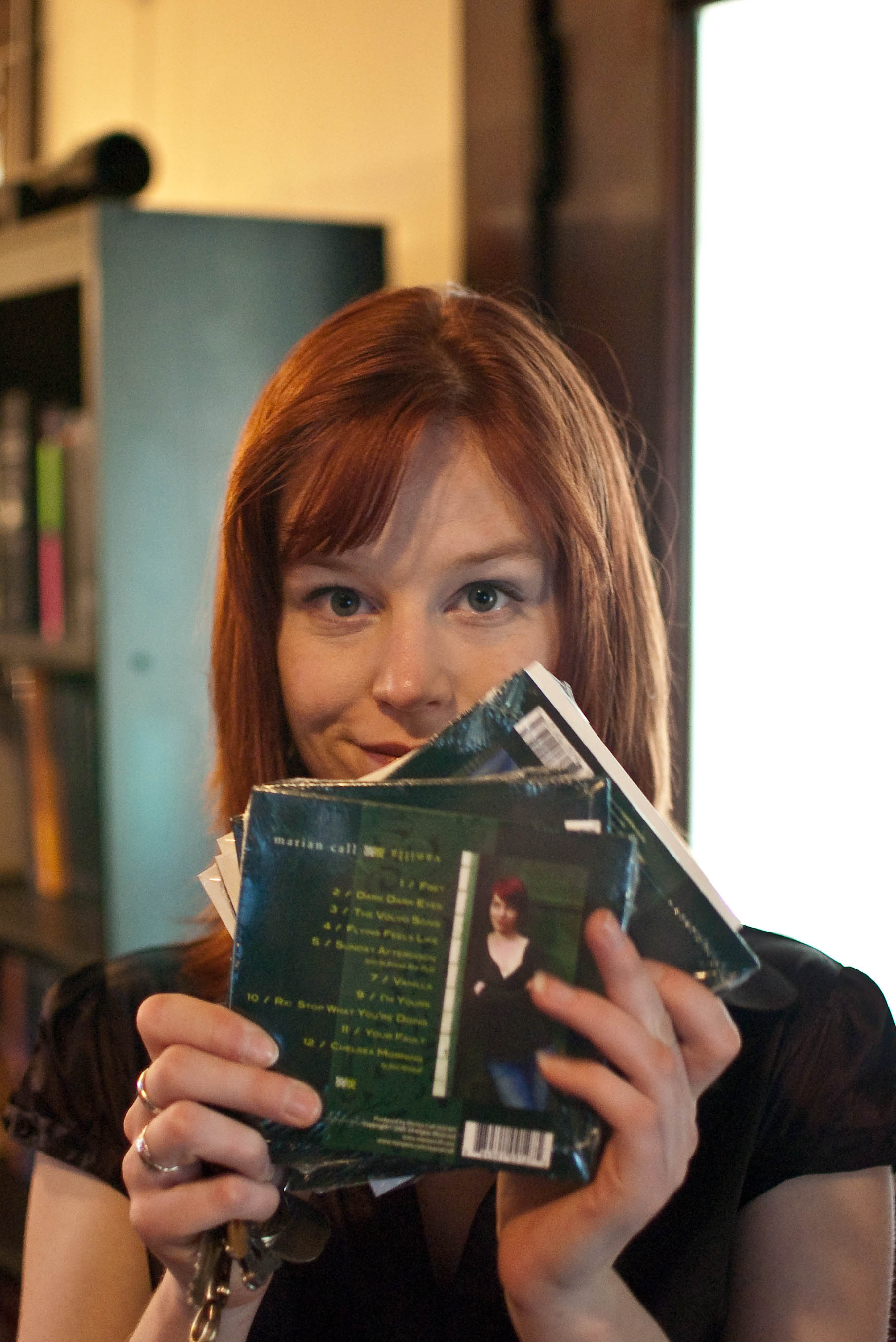
Marian Call displaying her CDs in 2010.

In the spring of 2010, Call announced her 49>50 Tour, a do-it-yourself national tour where Call would drive across the country stopping to play at the cities her fans have requested. The title of the tour, while mathematically incorrect is done so purposely to reflect her Alaskan pride, as Alaska is the 49th state. It also reflects the bringing of her music from the 49th state to all 50 states (49 to 50). The goal of the tour was to play in every state, whether at public venues or at small house concerts.

In December 2010, she achieved her goal of playing all the states within the year, and managed to include several Canadian provinces.

=== Marian Call European Adventure Quest!!! ===
As a means to visit all her fans in Europe, in June 2012 she created a Kickstarter project to fund her tour. It was a great success (being 570% funded). The European Adventure took place in October and November 2012. Marian went to Europe and played more than 25 concerts in seven countries, including the Netherlands, Germany, Switzerland, Austria, the Czech Republic, the United Kingdom, and the Republic of Ireland.

=== Ladies of Ragnarok ===
Marian has also made several appearances with Molly Lewis and The Doubleclicks on their "Ladies of Ragnarok" tour in September 2012.

=== The Postcard Tour ===
In 2013 Marian toured parts of the U.S., Canada and Europe during the "Postcard Tour". At each concert, Marian would ask the audience members to take a postcard out of the hand made mail bag she took along and to write or draw something on new postcards which were then taken along to later concerts.

== Discography ==
I'll Still Be a Geek After Nobody Thinks it's Chic
A short sample of "I'll Still Be a Geek After Nobody Thinks it's Chic" from the album Marian Call: Live in Europe (2013), featuring Call's vocals and use of a typewriter as a percussion instrument.

- Vanilla (2007)
- The Song of the Month Project (2008)
- Got to Fly (2008)
- Something Fierce (2011)
- Marian Call: Live in Europe (2013)
- Sketchbook (2013)
- Question Bedtime (2014) – supporting vocals by MC Frontalot
- Marian Call Sings the Classics, vol. I (2014)
- Yippee Ki Yay (2014)
- Marian Call Sings the Classics, vol. II (2015)
- Standing Stones (2017)
- Swears (2020)
