= Hard 'n Phirm =

American comedy/parody musical duo

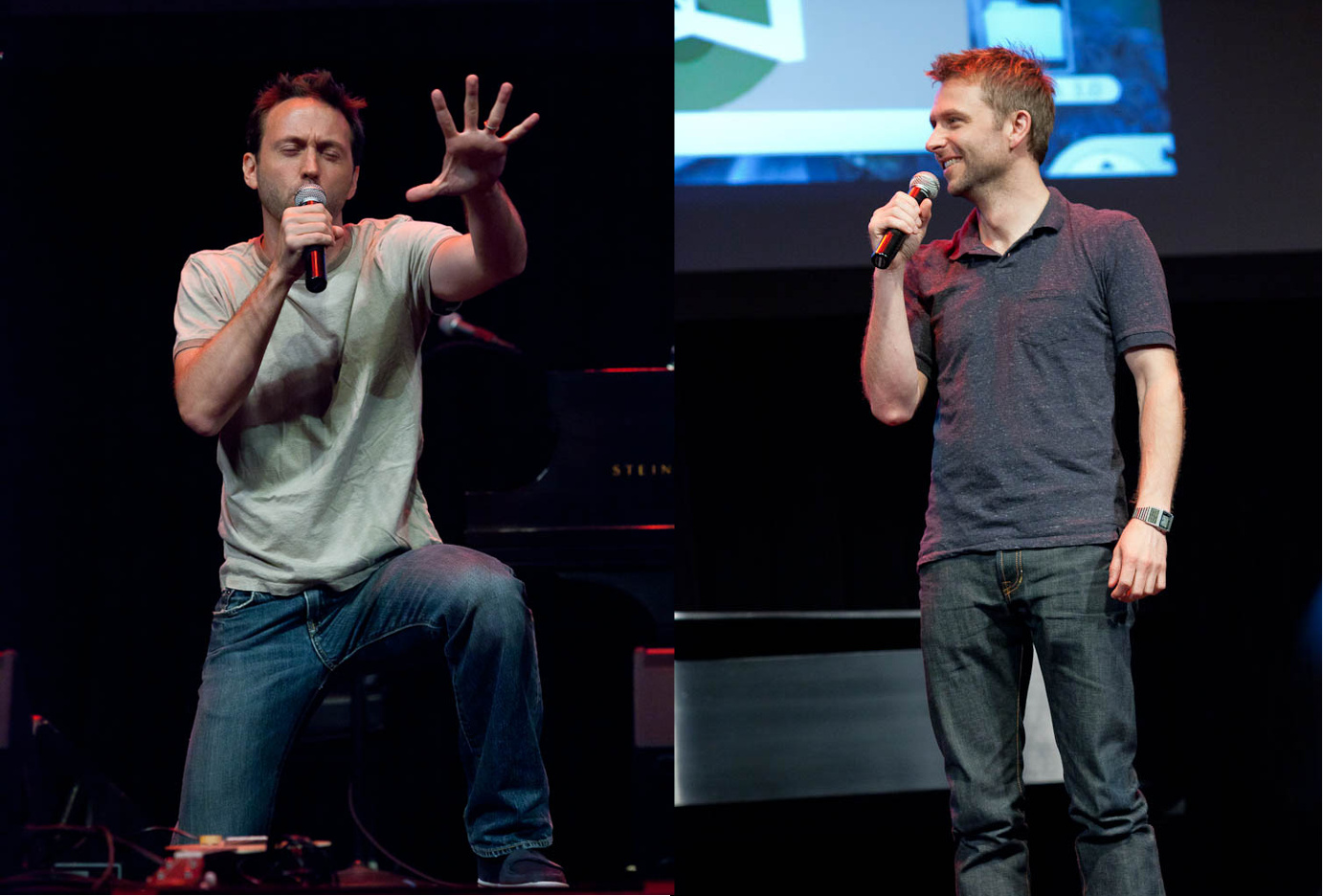
- Mike Phirman (left) and Chris Hardwick at w00tstock 2011

Background information
- Origin: Los Angeles, California, United States
- Genres: Comedy rock
- Years active: 1994–1997, 2004–2009
- Labels: N/A
- Past members: Chris Hardwick; Mike Phirman

Hard 'n Phirm were a comedy/parody musical duo from Los Angeles, California consisting of members Chris Hardwick & Mike Phirman. The duo began performing together at UCLA in 1994 but would eventually break up in 1997, only to reunite 7 years later in 2004 and resume performing for another 5 years — ultimately breaking up for good in 2009. After the success of their song "Rodeohead" (a bluegrass-style medley of Radiohead covers), the duo released what would turn out to be their first and only album: Horses and Grasses — featuring their song "Pi," which had gained popularity from its music video, directed by Keith Schofield.

== Television and Internet specials ==
In 2008, the duo aired their own special for Comedy Central Presents, which included performances of "American Dinosaurs", "Anything", a reprise of "Pi", and included the unreleased song "Not Illegal" as well as their performance art piece "Def Poetry Spam". In 2007 they appeared on the comedy compilation Comedy Death-Ray. In February 2008, the group won the Effinfunny.com Comedian of the Year Award. Phirman also voiced the character Narrator's Brother in the WordGirl episode "Mecha-Mouse".

They have written a number of television and podcast theme songs, including the theme to Doug Benson's podcast Doug Loves Movies as well as Benson's 2010 Comedy Central series The Benson Interruption.

== Discography ==
=== Studio albums ===
Year	Album details
2005	Horses and Grasses: Release date: February 22, 2005; Label: Independent

== Recent work ==
The duo wrote and performed the songs for Rob Zombie's The Haunted World of El Superbeasto, which was released on September 22, 2009.

Phirman released his first solo album in July 2010, The Very Last Songs I Will Ever Record (Part 1), which is available as a download from his website. He also recorded an album called "Songs to Sing at Children" in 2018.
