= LeakyCon =

Series of fan conventions from 2009 to 2024

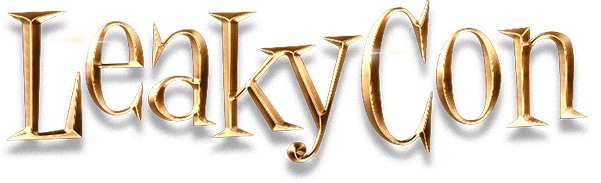
- Status: Defunct
- Genre: Harry Potter; Fantasy
- Frequency: Usually annually
- Venue: Varied
- Location: Varied
- Countries: United States; England; Ireland
- Years active: 2009–2024
- Inaugurated: 21–24 May 2009
- Founders: Melissa Anelli; Stephanie Dornhelm
- Most recent: 5–7 July 2024
- Organiser: Mischief Management, LLC

LeakyCon was a series of fan conventions that occurred from 2009 through 2024 and were organised by Mischief Management, LLC. The frequency varied, but it was generally an annual convention.

The first event was held in Boston, Massachusetts, with an attendance of over 750. Attendance peaked in 2018 in Dallas, Texas, with 18,000. In 2024, a reported 2,800 people attended the final Portland, Oregon convention. It was held in a total of six cities within the United States, as well as London, England and outside Dublin, Ireland, with a total of sixteen conventions between 2009 and 2024.

Activities included live performances of wizard rock as well as fan-made productions, panels ranging from scholarly discussions to question and answer sessions with stars as well as both film and literary industry experts, live recordings of podcasts, Quidditch, and autograph sessions. Scholastic, Warner Bros., Sony Pictures, and Simon & Schuster chose to premiere new material to fans through LeakyCon over various convention years. In 2011 and 2014, LeakyCon attendees were able to purchase special "Open at the Close" tickets to enter The Wizarding World of Harry Potter in Orlando, Florida. Attendees in 2016 were able to purchase special tickets for the Hollywood theme park.

An attempt in 2015 to move LeakyCon away from the multi-fandom event it had become through renaming the main convention and holding a separate LeakyCon in 2016 as a smaller, intimate event to return to being solely a Harry Potter event was abandoned by 2017. Following the COVID-19 pandemic and postponement of both the 2020 and 2021 conventions, however, sales declined as some of the audience typically attending LeakyCon no longer felt comfortable doing so after J. K. Rowling's comments in support of transphobic feminism. Mischief Management CEO Melissa Anelli announced that the convention would broaden its base audience and distance itself from Harry Potter in 2023.

The decision was made to end LeakyCon with the 2024 Portland convention and establish a broader fantasy-centric event named EnchantiCon.

== Overview ==
The idea for LeakyCon originated from a convention The Leaky Cauldron web staff attended together in 2007.

=== Preliminary funding ===
LeakyCon was directed by Melissa Anelli and Stephanie Dornhelm, both as volunteers for The Leaky Cauldron. They had originally intended to call it CauldronCon, but a convention by that name had already been held in Massachusetts in 2005.

Prior to the first LeakyCon in 2009, wizarding rock groups performed for a fundraising night outside of the Terminus 2008 convention in Chicago. The dance party, held on Friday, 8 August 2008 and only accessible by showing ID to prove the attendee was at least seventeen, was organised by Wrock Wreggies. Performers included The Chocolate Frogs, Dreary Inferi, Swish and Flick, and The Whomping Willows. Though separate from the Terminus conference, (Note: Terminus was produced by Narrate Conferences, Inc.) transportation was provided to the concert for Terminus ticket holders.

Even with the fundraiser, Anelli used US$7,500 (Note: BuzzFeed News stated US$7,500 in 2015; Crain's New York printed US$10,000 in 2018.) of her own money to start LeakyCon, and had to borrow funds from her parents to pay for the initial convention.

=== Charity ===
LeakyCon was promoted as a charity event, with the editor of LeakyNews stating, "Just by attending LeakyCon, people are giving back and helping those less fortunate."

The first convention's proceeds went to benefit Book Aid International and the Harry Potter Alliance. Later conventions added the This Star Won't Go Out foundation and Friends In Deed. The first convention raised US$20,000 for charity. LeakyCon 2011 brought the total to US$120,000. 2012's Chicago convention raised the total to US$200,000. By 2015, the total donated to charities exceeded US$300,000.

Imagine Better, an initiative intended to spread the charitable efforts of the Harry Potter Alliance to other fandoms, was created at LeakyCon 2011 out of concern that the social awareness projects would end if the Harry Potter fandom were to become a "zombie fandom" after the release of Harry Potter and the Deathly Hallows – Part 2 on 15 July 2011.

In 2013, LeakyCon instituted a scholarship program, offering US$2,500 for academics. An art fellowship for US$5,000 was also available.

=== Composition ===
Attendance consisted primarily of young females, and was supported by Nerdfighteria members. Cosplay was common and spanned multiple fandoms.

Many attendees were LGBTQIA+ people, some of whom preferred to identify with the abbreviation GSM. LeakyCon was "an intersection of largely female, queer-friendly youth cultures". According to Anelli in 2023, LeakyCon statistically had a ratio of genderqueer and gender non-conforming attendees that was at least five times greater than other comparable U.S. events. Issues important to this community, like marriage equality, were sometimes addressed in a whimsical manner at the convention, such as the Harry Potter Alliance holding a vote at LeakyCon for Harry Potter character marriages. Gender-neutral bathrooms were instituted at the rebranded GeekyCon in 2015, and continued to be a feature once the name reverted to LeakyCon, both before and after Rowling's anti-trans rhetoric.

Booths at the convention reflected attendees' social activism, featuring animal rights activists and organizations such as Uplift with a focus on sexual harassment. Such activism extended to activities at the convention, such as when attendees demonstrated their opinions of rape culture at the 2014 Esther Earl Ball. When the DJ began to play "Blurred Lines", the dancing stopped and everyone booed until the song was changed.

One criticism of the composition of attendees was the lack of outreach to non-white and marginalised communities, and specifically that fans in the city where the convention was ongoing in communities of color were entirely unaware of LeakyCon.

=== Content ===
Regardless of its advertisement as a Harry Potter convention, LeakyCon attracted fans from multiple fandoms. Attendees were even fans of fanworks. For example, wizarding rock music was a staple at LeakyCon events, with significant parts of the conventions being dedicated to live performances. LeakyCon provided the largest audience at a single time for wizarding rock musicians in the United States. Attendees developed their own traditions around wizarding rock, such as "The Circle of Awesome", which had been in practice since 2009. Wizarding rock involvement was also a part of GeekyCon, and EnchantiCon 2025, which also had a wizarding rock concert held offsite, separate from the event itself.

Panels included discussions on civil liberties, the cultural impact of Harry Potter as a "phenomenon", its impact on literature, and social justice. Critique also extended to literary analysis and the question of objective consumption of the series. Some panels debated what material constitutes the canon of Harry Potter.

At some of the conventions, they broached controversial social issues, expanding the context of depictions in Harry Potter to the real world and allowing debate of issues such as civil rights, white privilege, and segregation. Panels also included critique of Harry Potter in relation to diversity, which extended to the representation of Korean history in relation to Fantastic Beasts: The Crimes of Grindelwald, specifically with respect to Nagini.

Panels at the 2022 Orlando convention addressed the Harry Potter LGBTQIA+ community's reactions to Rowling's gender identity comments.

=== Staffing ===
LeakyCon was dependent upon volunteers: the 2011 convention included among its attendees more than 140 volunteers, and in 2012, Anelli recruited an unpaid social media manager. The entire staff of the 2012 convention were unpaid volunteers. In 2014, pop-up programming sometimes relied on attendees volunteering their time and talents.

Panelists were unpaid. In one particularly memorable panel at the 2012 convention, attendee and Severus Snape cosplayer Nigel Taylor ended up giving a lecture on Lily Evans when the scheduled speaker didn't show.

== 2009 ==
The inaugural convention took place at the Park Plaza Hilton in Boston, 21–24 May 2009. There were more than 750 (Note: The Boston Phoenix printed 750 in 2009; BuzzFeed News printed 750 in 2015; Crain's New York printed 2,200 in 2018.) attendees and more than 70 various panels and activities. Among the invited guests were Michael Goldenberg; keynote speakers Hank Green and John Green; Lev Grossman, who was discussing his then-upcoming release of The Magicians; Arthur A. Levine Books senior editor Cheryl Klein; and Kansas State University professor of British literature Karin Westman.

Among the performers were the Potter Puppet Pals. Live music performances at the event were compiled onto an album which was presold online for US$17 and presold at the event for US$20, with proceeds benefiting Book Aid International and the Harry Potter Alliance. Draco and the Malfoys, Gred and Forge, Harry and the Potters, Justin Finch-Fletchley and the Sugar Quills, The Moaning Myrtles, The Mudbloods, The Parselmouths, The Remus Lupins, Riddle TM, Swish and Flick, Tonks and the Aurors, and The Whomping Willows performed live, and all had recordings on the album. Music performances at the event were divided into three separate programs, not including performances that took place as a part of other portions of the convention. The groups The House of Black and Ministry of Magic also had recordings included on the album, which was released 25 October 2010.

An authenticity-certified signed hardback set of the Harry Potter novels and companion books, ten in all, was provided by J. K. Rowling specifically for LeakyCon in 2009; to obtain the set required attendance at the event.

== 2011 ==
No LeakyCon took place in 2010, as The Leaky Cauldron crew who had organised the 2009 convention had planned to take the year off, though Anelli told Reuters that the interval between conventions was to allow attendees to be able to budget for the cost of traveling to Orlando. Rather than a year off, the LeakyCon crew were contacted by Hank and John Green and helped to organise the inaugural VidCon.

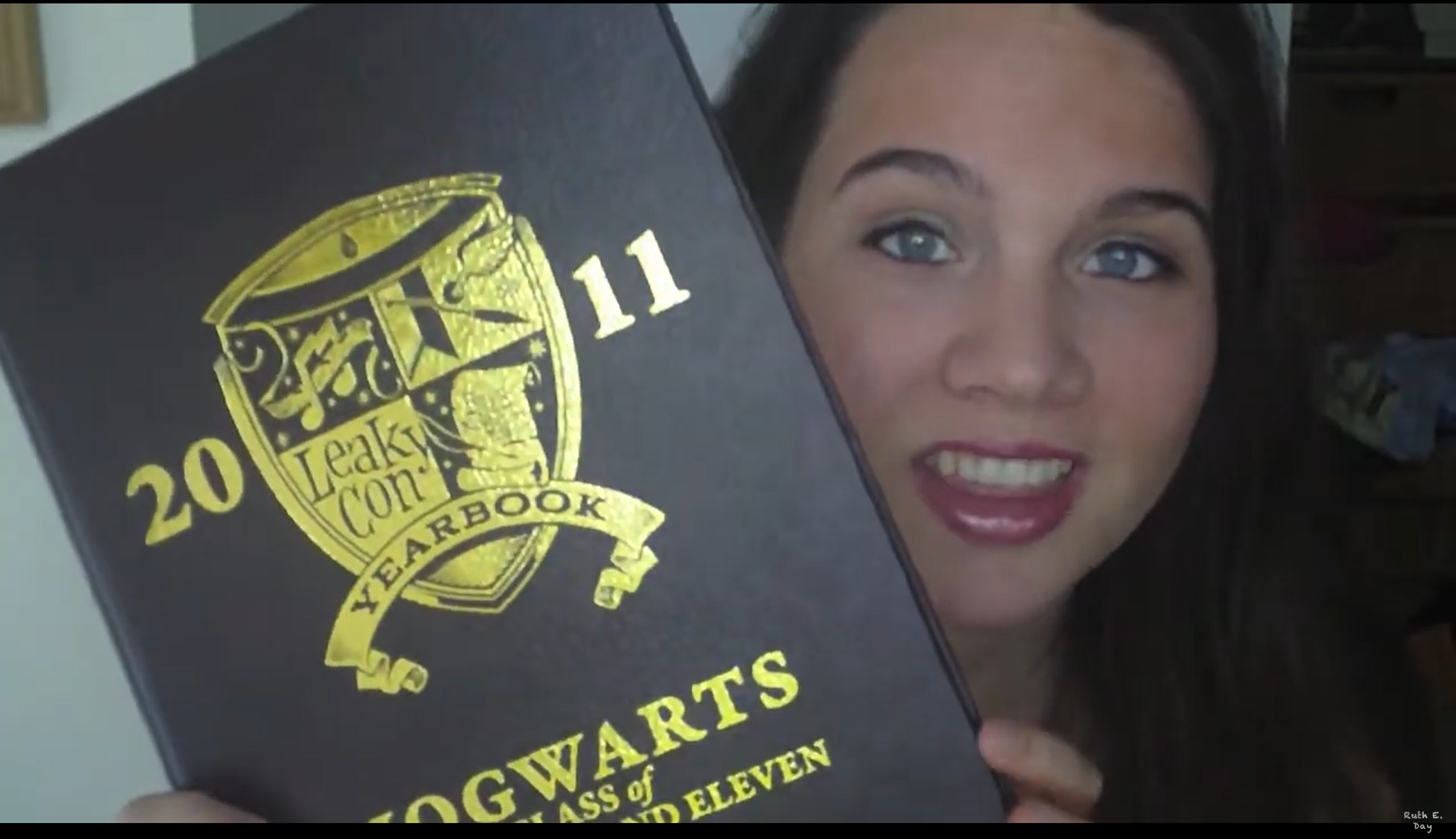
Yearbooks were provided for attendees in lieu of event programs after the convention.

The 2011 convention was held 13–17 July 2011 at Loews Royal Pacific Resort in Orlando, Florida. There were 3,400 (Note: The Orlando Sentinel stated 3,400 in 2011. In a 2025 interview, Anelli claimed there were 3,500 attendees each day of the 2011 convention.) attendees, including over 140 volunteer staff. A private party for the convention took place inside The Wizarding World of Harry Potter from 10:00 PM, 13 July to 1:30 AM, 14 July.

From 15 July 2011 at 6:00 AM Eastern through 18 July 2011 at 3:00 AM Eastern, LeakyCon Radio was broadcast by SiriusXM. Several panels were broadcast, as well as information on Pottermore and the Universal Orlando Wizarding World theme park. Anelli was a speaker regarding Pottermore, as she had been working as a consultant on the site since 2009. James Deeley, creative director for Pottermore, headed the presentation.

Among the invited guests were Helena Barlow, Arthur Bowen, Scarlett Byrne, Benedict Clarke, Ellie Darcey-Alden, Rohan Gotobed, Evanna Lynch, Chris Rankin, Ryan Turner, and Will Dunn.

In addition to fan-created and performed musicals The Fountain of Fair Fortune, The Last Battle and The Warlock's Hairy Heart, both StarKid Productions, drawing an audience of 3,000, and Potter Puppet Pals performed live. Keynote speakers included Arthur A. Levine, the U.S. editor for the Harry Potter series, and Electronic Arts, who produced Harry Potter video games. ArtInsights debuted six new prints designed by Stuart Craig and illustrated by Andrew Williamson at the convention.

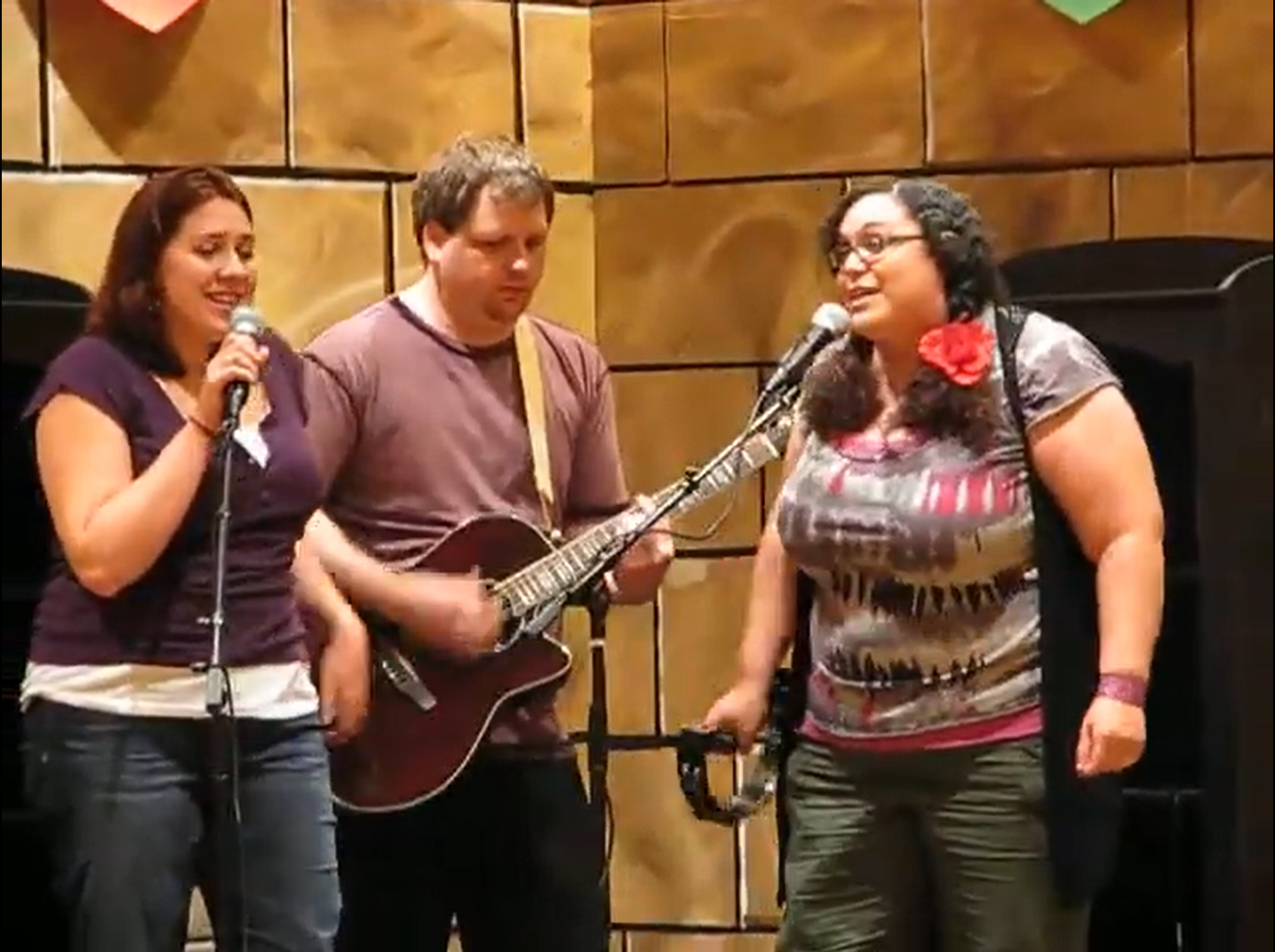
Wizarding rock band Hawthorn and Holly performing their song "La La Luna" at LeakyCon 2011.

Two concerts featuring twelve bands were scheduled. LeakyCon 2011: Live at the Leaky Cauldron II, a collection of 33 tracks from performances at the convention, was released on 17 August 2016 and featured Draco and the Malfoys, Lauren Fairweather, Gred and Forge, Hank Green, Harry and the Potters, The House of Black, Justin Finch-Fletchley and the Sugar Quills, MC Kreacher, The Parselmouths, Tonks and the Aurors, and The Whomping Willows. Evanna Lynch was featured on the final track, with Harry and the Potters.

A literary track was introduced to LeakyCon in 2011, which was organised by Maureen Johnson.

John Green met Esther Earl, who later served as inspiration for The Fault in Our Stars, in person at LeakyCon 2009. After her death 25 August 2010, the LeakyCon ball was renamed "The Esther Earl Rocking Charity Ball", beginning with the 2011 convention. Anelli stated she initially expected the 2011 event to be the only other LeakyCon, but when closing out the Esther Earl Ball, she decided to continue organising the convention.

== 2012 ==
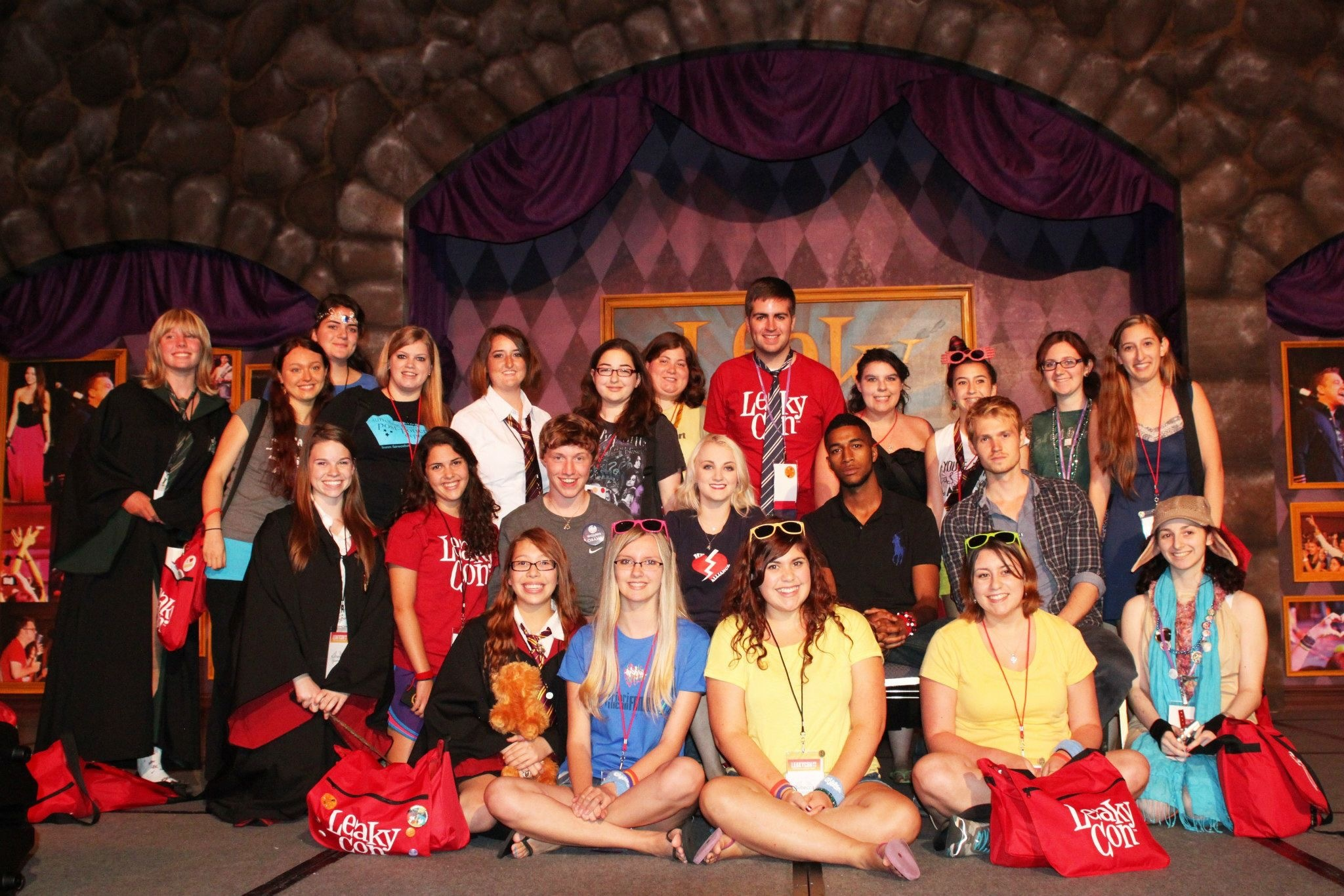
A group of attendees and invited guests at LeakyCon 2012 in Chicago, Illinois.

Held in Chicago, the 2012 convention had approximately 3,800 (Note: The Observer and Willamette Week both reported 3,800 attendees in 2012; BuzzFeed News reported 4,000 in 2015.) attendees, and took place from 9–12 August at the Hilton Chicago. The Harry Potter Alliance's charity project for the event was "Live the Lovegood Way". LeakyCon instituted "Charity Row" in the vendors' hall for the first time, which included areas for attendees to donate to the Alliance, ShelterBox, Kamp Kiwanis, Oxfam, Snow City Arts, and Reading Is Fundamental.

Guests included activist Nancee Lee-Allen, Evanna Lynch, Louis Cordice, Robbie Jarvis, John Granger, Scarlett Byrne, Dominic Barnes, Riker Lynch, Titus Makin Jr., Curt Mega, William Melling, and Anelli herself, as well as StarKid Productions, The Lizzie Bennet Diaries, Potter Puppet Pals, and MinaLima. Melling revealed at this LeakyCon that his movie-only character, Nigel Wolpert, would have followed the same path as Colin Creevey, but was ultimately omitted from the final film for the same reason that Creevey's character was replaced — he no longer had a "childlike" enough appearance for the impact the filmmakers wanted.

The premiere performance of "A Very Potter 3-D: A Very Potter Senior Year", announced less than a month prior to the convention, lasted four-and-a-half hours. The troupe was only able to rehearse for three days prior to the performance. Evanna Lynch stepped in to play the part of Luna Lovegood. Dubbed "A Very StarKid Event (II)", it was announced after LeakyCon tickets had already been on sale, and required altering registration for seating to view live, but was viewable in a separate ballroom via live feed for those having at least a day pass for Saturday events. Left over props from the show, signed by members of Team Starkid, were given away through the LeakyCon and LeakyNews websites beginning in May 2013.

ArtInsights premiered another set of art prints to LeakyCon attendees at the 2012 convention.

Book guests for the literary track included Holly Black, Daniel Ehrenhaft, John Green, Stephanie Perkins, Margaret Stohl, Lev Grossman, Amanda Hocking, Jennifer Laughran, Rebecca Sherman, Laini Taylor, Kate Schafer Testerman, Megan Whalen Turner, and Robin Wasserman. Maureen Johnson moderated the "I Was a Teenage Writer" panel.

The convention also featured a Quidditch match between Puddlemere United and the Appleby Arrows.

== 2013 ==
=== Portland, Oregon ===
The Portland LeakyCon was held at the Oregon Convention Center from 27 to 30 June 2013. Approximately 5,000 (Note: The Oregon Young Adult Network and Antenna reported 5,000 attendees in 2013; the Orlando Business Journal reported "more than 4,000" in 2014.) people attended the convention. The convention opened with the "Fittie 5K", the first walk/run event for LeakyCon attendees.

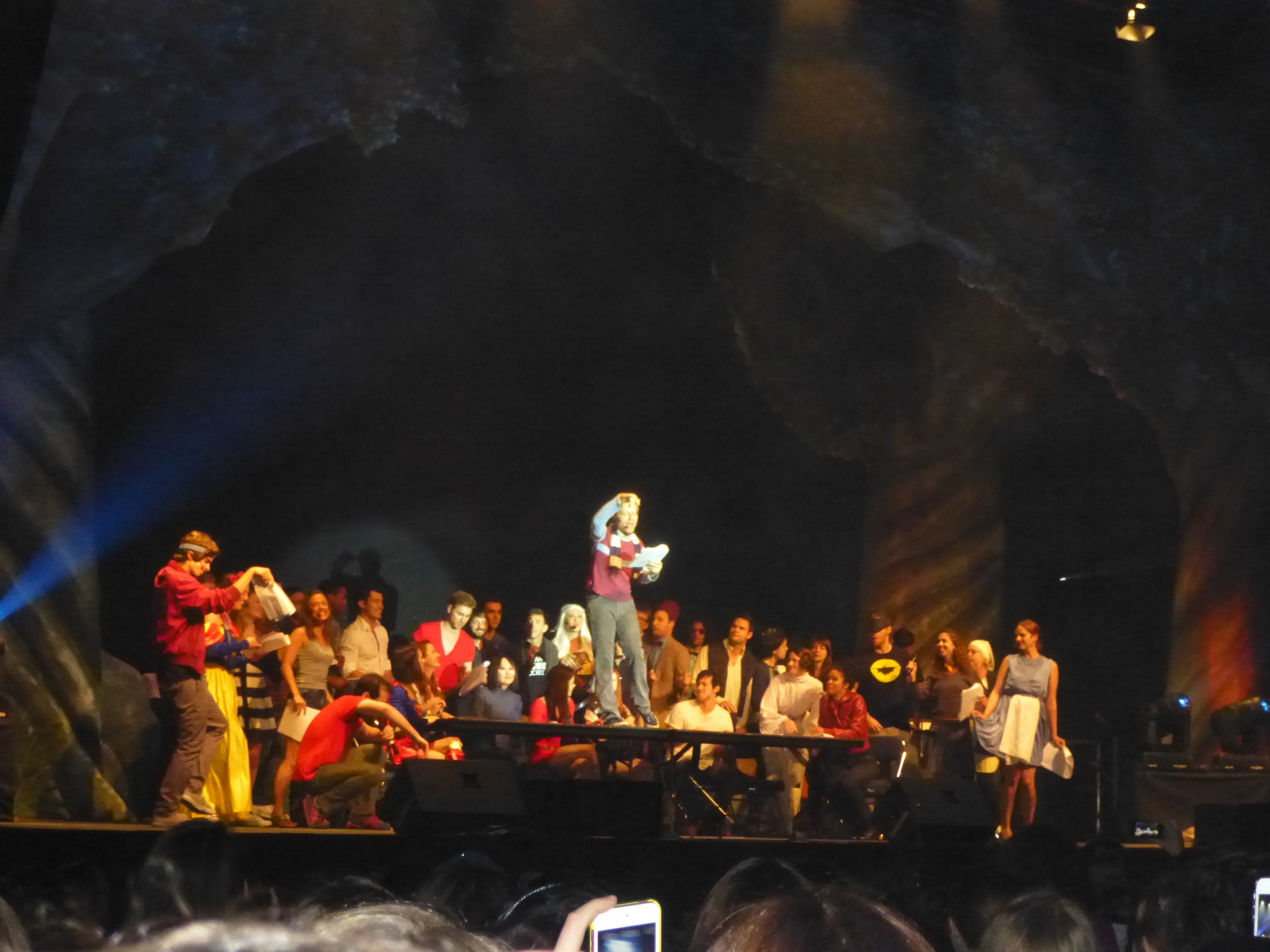
Opening ceremonies at LeakyCon Portland on 27 June 2013.

Guests included Amber Benson, Scarlett Byrne, Ellie Darcey-Alden, Jacqueline Emerson, Tom Lenk, Devon Murray, and Anthony Rapp, as well as cast and creators from The Lizzie Bennet Diaries, including Hank Green.

Green was also listed as one of the musical acts, along with Alex Carpenter, Lauren Fairweather, Justin Finch-Fletchley, Harry and the Potters, Kirstyn Hippe, Ministry of Magic, Tonks and the Aurors, The Whomping Willows, and The Doubleclicks. The Dalton Academy Warblers' Dominic Barnes, Titus Makin Jr., and Curt Mega were present as well.

LeakyLit was extended to two days and featured Lev Grossman, Maureen Johnson, David Levithan, Rebecca Carlson, E. Lockhart, Rainbow Rowell, Maggie Stiefvater, Leigh Bardugo, Coe Booth, Heather Brewer, Andrea Cremer, Matt de la Peña, Barry Lyga, Lauren Myracle, Stephanie Perkins, and Laini Taylor. Maureen Johnson and Robin Wasserman co-directed LeakyLit in 2013.

Senior Scholastic editor Cheryl Klein revealed the new cover art for Harry Potter and the Prisoner of Azkaban by Kazu Kibuishi during the convention's opening ceremony. It was displayed as a five foot tall print in the exhibit hall throughout the convention. On 28 June, Bernie Su announced that Touchstone Books would be releasing a novelization of The Lizzie Bennet Diaries in summer 2014. On 29 June, the convention screened footage from The Mortal Instruments: City of Bones, as well as the film's trailer; a pre-taped interview with Cassandra Clare was shown between the two.

=== London, England ===
LeakyCon partnered with Alohomora 2013 to host the first international LeakyCon convention in London, 8–11 August 2013. It was held at the Grand Connaught Rooms. The convention began with the Warner Bros. Studios Leavesden tour in Watford. Attendance was limited to 1,500.

Guests included Benedict Clarke, Robbie Jarvis, Joe Walker, Scarlett Byrne, Alfie Enoch, Evanna Lynch, Ellie Darcey-Alden, Rohan Gotobed, Chris Rankin, and Ryan Turner.

Wizarding rock performers included The Blibbering Humdingers, Alex Carpenter, Lauren Fairweather, Harry and The Potters, Jason Munday, RiddleTM, Romilda Vane and the Chocolate Cauldrons, Siriusly Hazza P, Solitary Snape, and The Whomping Willows.

LeakyCon partnered with J. K. Rowling's Lumos charity.

== 2014 ==
LeakyCon 2014 took place at the Orange County Convention Center in Orlando, Florida from 30 July to 3 August, and included a private event, "Open at the Close", inside Universal Studios, much like the 2011 convention. The Diagon Alley, Hogwarts Express, and Hogsmeade attractions were only open for LeakyCon attendees, from 8 PM, 30 July until 2 AM, 31 July. Approximately 1,500 attendees had tickets for the special event; total attendance at the convention was estimated as surpassing 5,000.

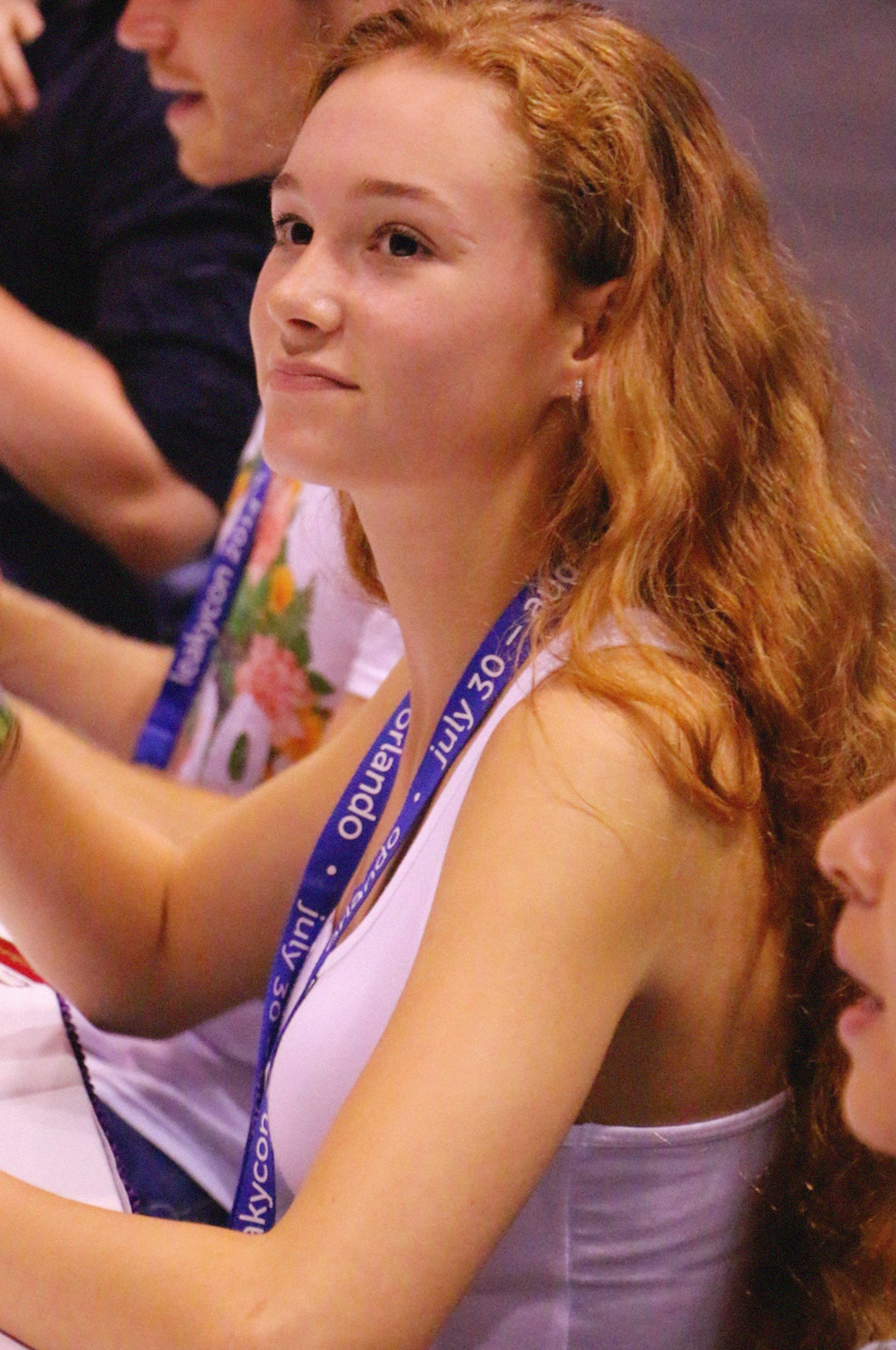
Ellie Darcey-Alden (Lily Evans) signs autographs at LeakyCon in Orlando, Florida (2 August 2014).

Guests included Dayeanne Hutton and James Brent Isaacs of Emma Approved, Hannah Hart, Jon Cozart, Joe Moses, Terra Netting, Hugh Mitchell, Nick Shirm, Charlotte Skeoch, Anna Lore, Bernie Su, Steve Zaragoza, Scarlett Byrne, Adam Glass, Alaina Huffman, MinaLima, Robbie Thompson, Nina Toussaint-White, Kazu Kibuishi, and Team Starkid. Musical acts included Alex Carpenter, Harry and the Potters, Meghan Tonjes, Lauren Fairweather, Molly Lewis, Not Literally, The Blibbering Humdingers, Draco and the Malfoys, Gred and Forge, and Tonks and the Aurors.

Young adult novelists John Green, Stephanie Perkins, Rainbow Rowell, and Scott Westerfeld revealed information about characters in their works by sorting them into Harry Potter houses at a Q&A session. Laurie Halse Anderson, Holly Black, Gayle Forman, Lev Grossman, Alaya Dawn Johnson, Varian Johnson, Malinda Lo, and Lauren Myracle were also guests for the literary track, which was organised by Maureen Johnson and Robin Wasserman. Lynn M. Boughey and Peter Earnest had a copy of Unauthorized Harry Potter and the Art of Spying printed specifically for LeakyCon 2014.

Corporate sponsorship, particularly from Tumblr, became more visibly pronounced.

Pemberley Digital premiered the first two episodes of Frankenstein, MD at the 2014 convention, and MinaLima announced a new project to make some of their art prints available on postcards and notebooks, and for books cataloguing the art of the Harry Potter films.

Organisers introduced pop-up programming – entertainment or activities that were not officially a part of the program – which relied on attendee participation in some cases. An impromptu pep band composed of approximately fifty attendees; a Lego station where attendees could build snowmen and occasionally be serenaded by Anna and Elsa cosplayers singing "Do You Want to Build a Snowman?"; and actor Maxwell Glick recreating the final scene of Sherlock season two were some of the unscheduled events.

At the close of the convention, Anelli announced that the existing LeakyCon, as a multiple fandom convention, would be rebranded as GeekyCon, with the LeakyCon name returning to being a Harry Potter only convention. GeekyCon was the only convention Mischief Management organised in 2015.

== 2016 ==
The 2016 convention took place from 19 to 23 October at the Marriott Hotel in Burbank, California. It was promoted as an "immersive" experience, with attendance limited to 500. Guests included Pierre Bohanna, Bryn Court, Ellie Darcey-Alden, Katy Fray, Laurent Guinci, and Charlotte Skeoch.

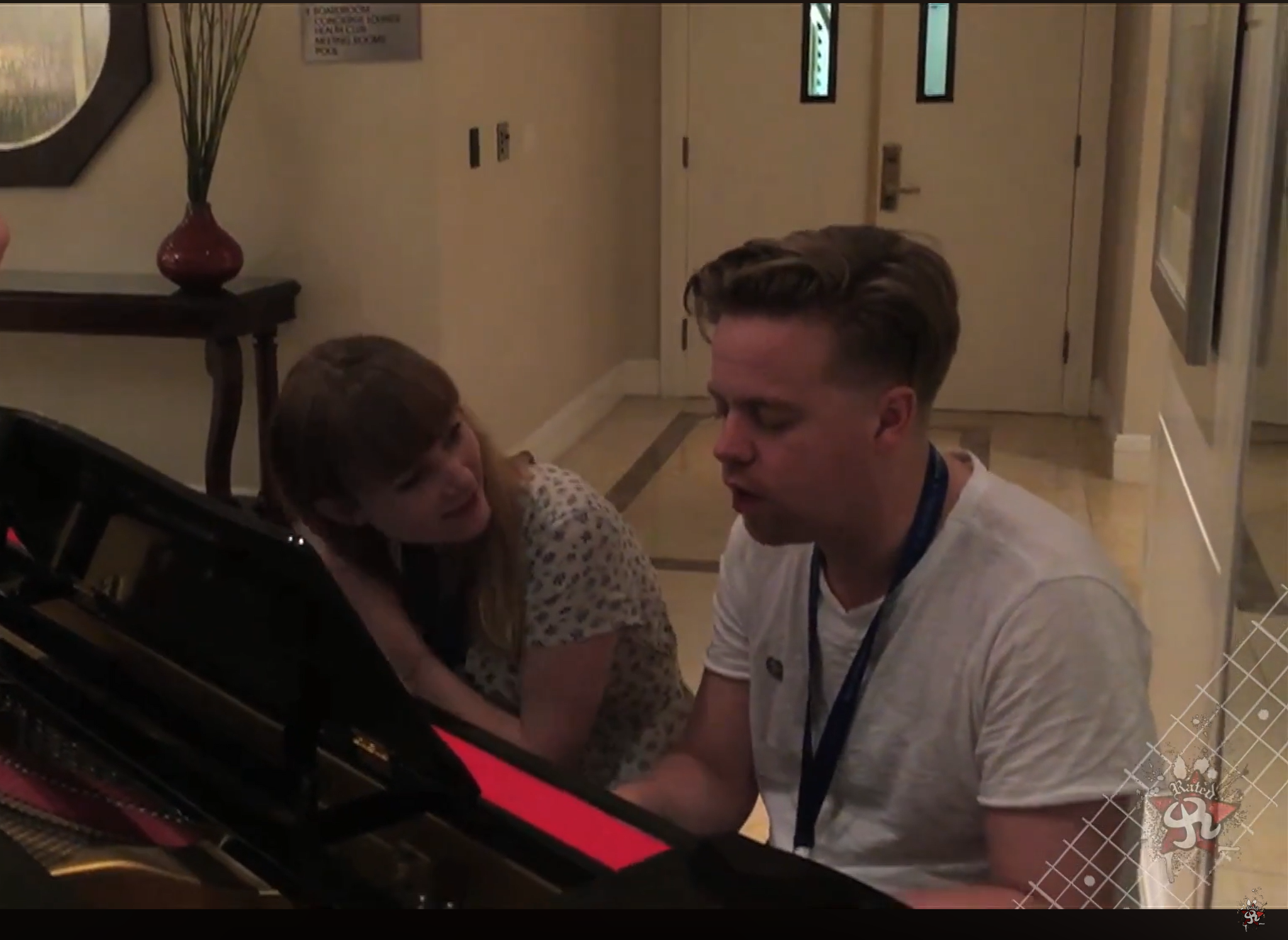
Nick Shirm (Zacharias Smith) and Charlotte Skeoch (Hannah Abbott) playing piano at LeakyCon 2016.

The Mudbloods, who had called their last performance in 2009 their final one, reunited for the convention, announcing an upcoming extended play release during their set. The Parselmouths also came out of retirement, joining wizarding rock bands Draco and the Malfoys, Lauren Fairweather, Tianna and the Cliffhangers, Tonks and the Aurors, and The Whomping Willows for the Burbank convention.

The convention featured a private event at Universal Studios Hollywood's Wizarding World of Harry Potter on 19 October from 6:00 PM until 10:00 PM, with bus transportation between venues an additional charge to the ticket prices.

Following this LeakyCon convention, Anelli announced on Tumblr that GeekyCon was on hiatus.

== 2017 ==
The 2017 convention took place at the Citywest Hotel in Saggart, Ireland, 31 August to 3 September. Guests included Dan Fogler, Afshan Azad, Pierre Bohanna, Louis Cordice, Jim Cornish, Alfred Enoch, Hero Fiennes Tiffin, Katie Leung, Evanna Lynch, Charlotte Skeoch, MinaLima, PotterCast, Potter Puppet Pals, and StarKid Productions. Hermione Granger and the Quarter Life Crisis were also present.

Wizarding rock performers at the convention included Draco and the Malfoys, Lauren Fairweather, Harry and the Potters, Romilda Vane and the Chocolate Cauldrons, Siriusly Hazza P, Solitary Snape, Tonks and the Aurors, and The Whomping Willows. LeakyLit featured authors included Juno Dawson, Moïra Fowley-Doyle, Catherine Johnson, Joshua Khan, Melinda Salsbury, and Elizabeth E. Wein.

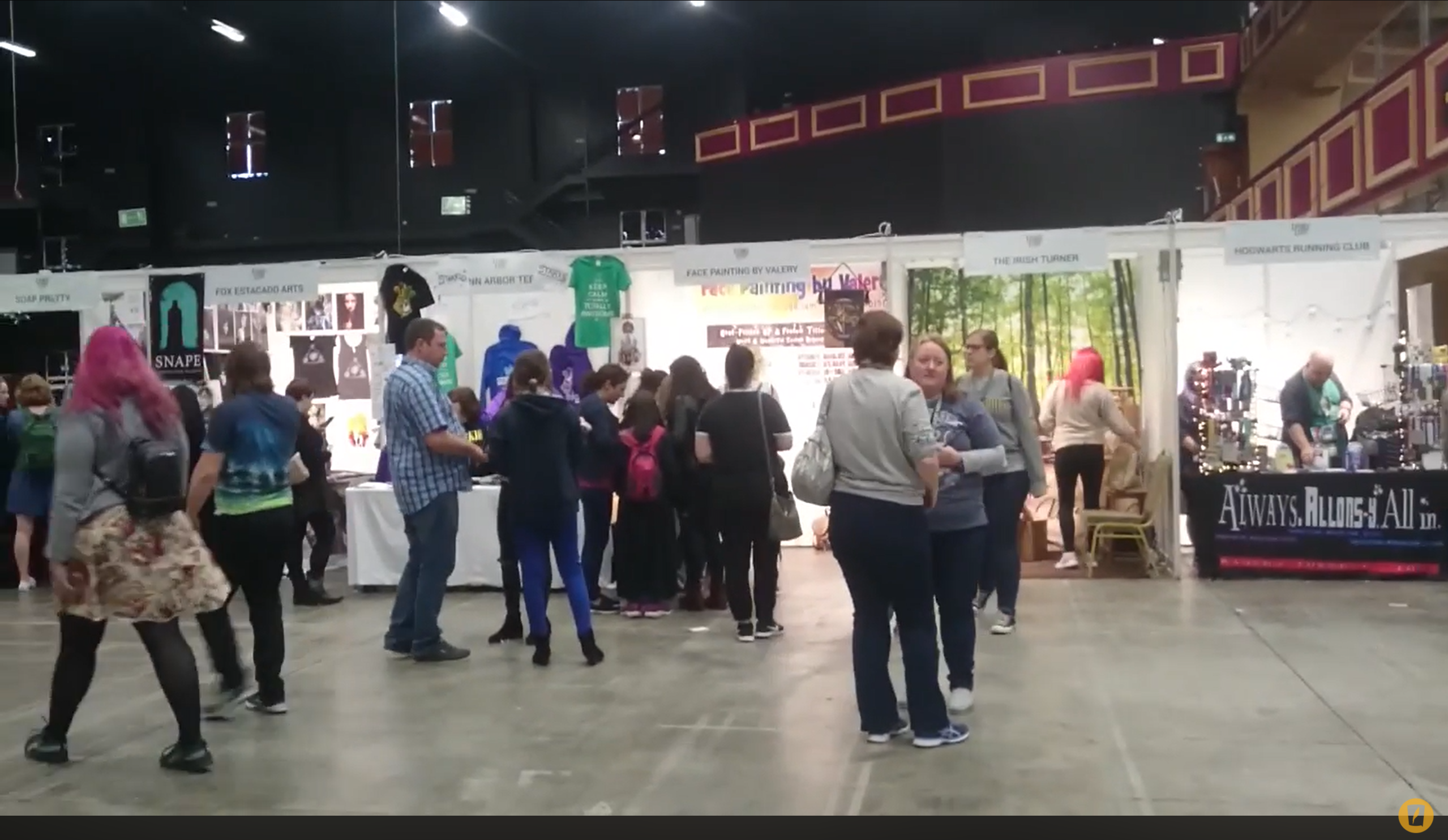
Marketplace and Fandom Expo at LeakyCon 2017.

Organisers added two new features to the Dublin convention: 'surprise' panels throughout the event, and an Expo Day devoted to photo-ops and autographs.

The Harry Potter Alliance was represented in person by Jackson Bird who discussed the projects "Granger Leadership Academy", a general program to help those interested in becoming activists, and "A World Without Hermione", an effort to bring equality for female, transgender, and non-binary students in schools worldwide.

Today FM reported attendance as being in the "thousands".

== 2018 ==
The 2018 location was originally scheduled for the Hyatt Regency Dallas. Organisers had at first set the convention for 3,000 tickets, but interest quickly resulted in doubling that number to 6,000. It was then moved to the Kay Bailey Hutchison Convention Center in Dallas, Texas, for 10–12 August 2018. Initial tickets went on sale 15 November 2017, with additional tickets added on 6 December 2017 once the location moved. The added tickets sold out within two days, and there were a total of 18,000 attendees.

In 2017, Warner Bros. began sending cease and desist letters to various festivals with Harry Potter themed events, including those held in Chestnut Hill, Philadelphia, Aurora, Illinois, and Ithaca, New York. The letters informed organisers of a prohibition on using the names of characters, objects, or locations from the series. Speaking to The Dallas Morning News, Anelli stated that the name "LeakyCon" had been approved for her use by Warner Bros. in 2009 and that she had taken steps to make certain that attendees were aware that LeakyCon was not officially affiliated with either Rowling or Warner Brothers. Anelli also said that Warner Bros. had not given Mischief Management "any indication that they have any problem with what we're doing."

Guests at the event included Scarlett Byrne, Louis Cordice, Christian Coulson, Dan Fogler, Alison Sudol, Ellie Darcey-Alden, Devon Murray, Chris Rankin, Stanislav Yanevski, and Luke Youngblood. Wizarding rock performers included Draco and the Malfoys, Lauren Fairweather, Harry and the Potters, The Mudbloods, Tonks and the Aurors, The Whomping Willows, and The Lovegoods. Members of Team Starkid were also present.

Several podcasts recorded live episodes at the event, including Harry Potter and the Sacred Text, MuggleCast, and PotterCast. The Sartorial Geek also recorded a live episode at the convention, interviewing then chief operating officer of Mischief Management Taekia Blackwell. Binge Mode was also present to record a live podcast with Chris Rankin.

Authors appearing at the event included Robin Benway, Kacen Callender, Mackenzi Lee, Mindy McGinnis, Anna-Marie McLemore, Julie Murphy, Mark Oshiro, Peng Shepherd, and Nic Stone.

== 2019 ==
=== Dallas,Texas ===
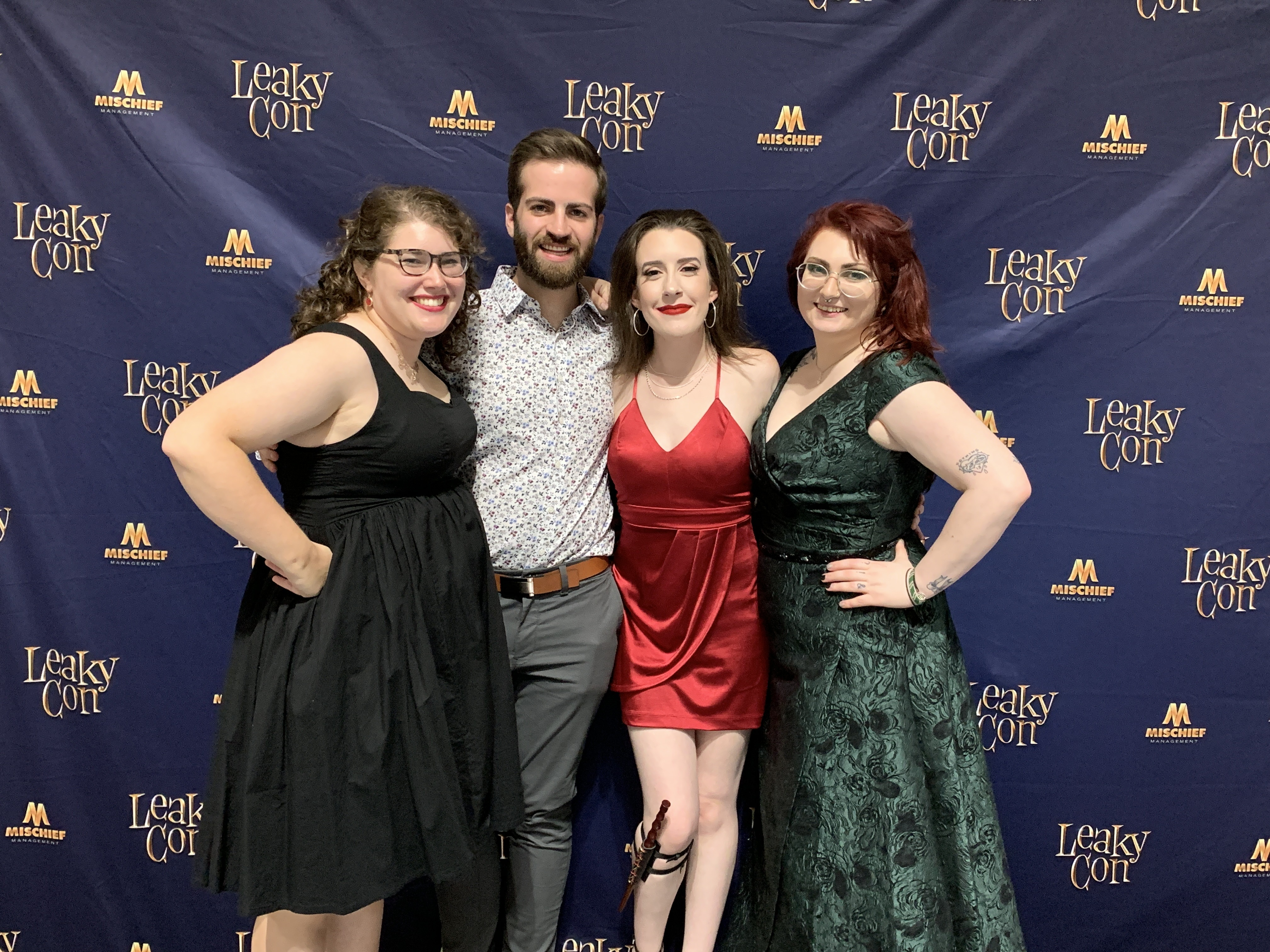
A group of attendees at LeakyCon 2019 in Dallas, Texas, before the Esther Earl Rocking Charity Ball.

Tickets for the 2019 Dallas LeakyCon went on sale 2 August 2018, before the 2018 convention had even taken place. The event was scheduled for 9–11 August 2019, at the Kay Bailey Hutchison Convention Center. There were approximately 10,000 (Note: The Dallas Morning News printed 10,000 at the time of the event. However, The Blade printed 18,000 in 2024.) attendees.

Guests included Afshan Azad, Tiana Benjamin, Scarlett Byrne, Tom Felton, Georgina Leonidas, Paul Harris, James Payton, and Jim Tavaré. Felton performed a concert exclusively for LeakyCon on Saturday, 10 August. Wizarding rock acts included Draco and the Malfoys, Harry and the Potters, Lauren Fairweather, and Tonks and the Aurors.

LeakyLit featured Becky Albertalli, Hafsah Faizal, Mackenzi Lee, Julie Murphy, Mark Oshiro, Justin A. Reynolds, Nic Stone, and Angie Thomas.

Some activities, such as Paul Harris' panel on dueling choreography in the Harry Potter films, required an additional ticket purchase to attend.

Organisers created a new "Family Day" on 11 August, promoting more crafts and games for younger children. They also had craft stations, with a different craft available each day of the convention, as well as a Quidditch game. The game took place inside, on a concrete floor with only a half-court, and required signing a waiver to play. Players were not required to have experience in the game, and teams were not composed of players with similar skill levels.

Additionally, LeakyCon encouraged all speakers present to omit associations with attendees' outward appearances.

=== Rose City Comic Con collaboration ===
LeakyCon was present at the Rose City Comic Con in Portland, Oregon from 13 to 15 September. They had five presentation slots, as well as "Wizard's Alley", which included booths and vendors. The "House Cup Challenge" held by LeakyCon organisers was to benefit the Harry Potter Alliance.

=== Boston, Massachusetts ===
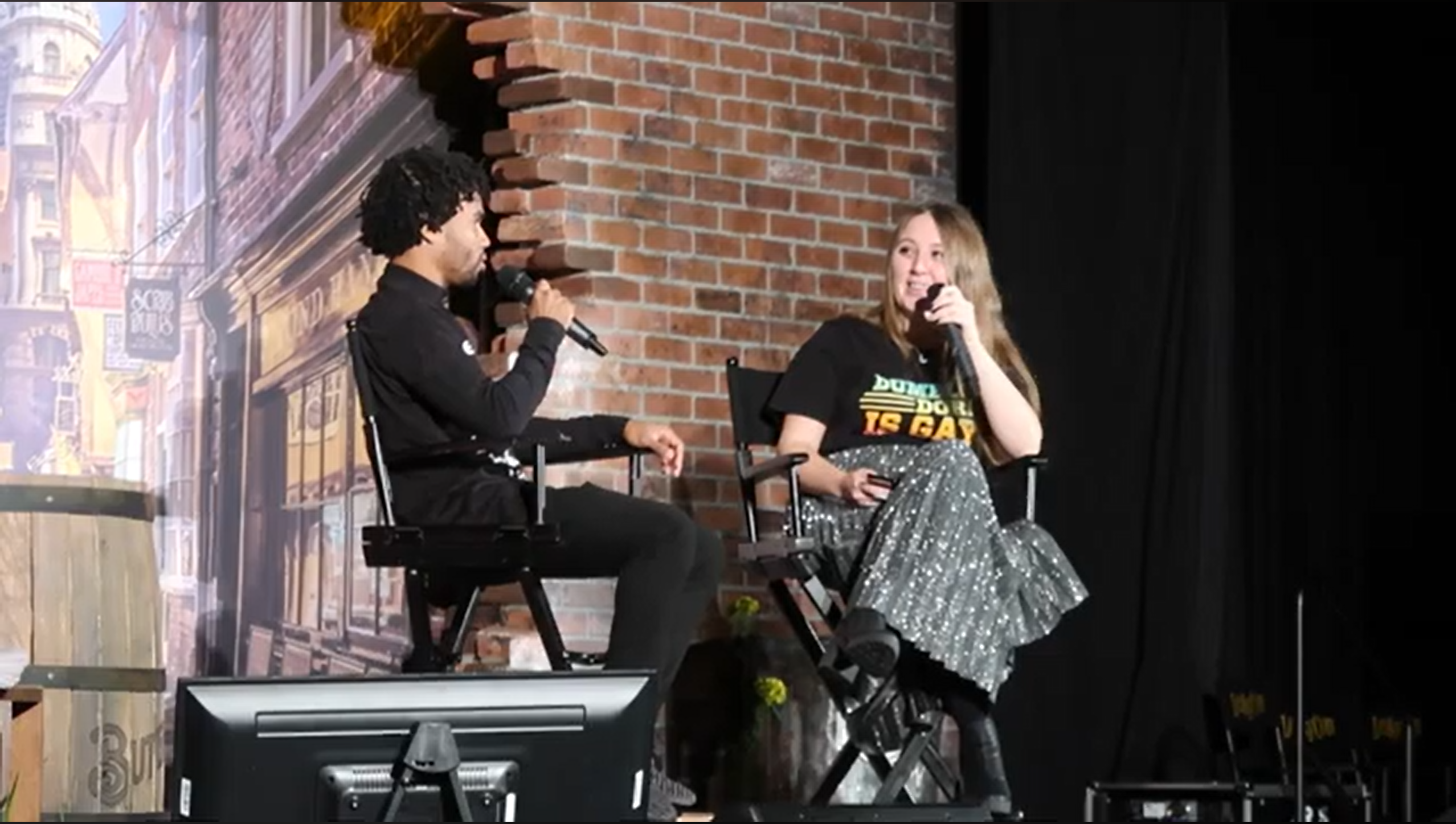
Luke Youngblood at a Q&A at LeakyCon 2019, Boston.

The Seaport Hotel and Seaport World Trade Center in Boston hosted the tenth anniversary LeakyCon, which was held 11–13 October 2019. Guests at the event included Louis Cordice, Dan Fogler, Chris Rankin, Stanislav Yanevski, and Luke Youngblood. Fogler announced that Fantastic Beasts: The Secrets of Dumbledore would begin filming in February 2020 during a Q&A session.

Musical acts included Draco and the Malfoys, Harry and the Potters, Lauren Fairweather, and Tonks and the Aurors. The LeakyCon pop-up pep band was also present, as was wizarding rock performer Ashley Trix. The fan-produced musical performance was The Other Chosen One, exploring the interactions of Neville Longbottom and Dumbledore's Army during Harry Potter and the Deathly Hallows.

Several podcasts recorded live shows, including Harry Potter and the Sacred Text, MuggleCast, PotterCast, and Swish and Flick. Tessa Netting of Fantastic Geeks was expected to attend and record a live podcast with Potterless, but was unable to due to medical reasons; the live podcast recording included Chris Rankin in Netting's place.

Potter Puppet Pals also gave a live performance.

Authors at the event included Jackson Bird, Kacen Callender, Preeti Chhibber, Mason Deaver, Claudia Gray, and Mark Oshiro.

Matt London, writer for Harry Potter: Hogwarts Mystery, led a panel and did a main stage presentation regarding the decisions in constructing the storyline for the game.

== Hiatus ==
=== COVID-19 ===
For 2020, dates had been announced for Orlando (31 July to 2 August) with guests Josh Herdman, Devon Murray, and Stanislav Yanevski; and Denver, Colorado (23–25 October), with Evanna Lynch having to move her guest slot from Orlando to Denver and LeakyCon offering to switch tickets as late as 4 March 2020.

On 11 March, Mischief Management announced on Facebook that they did not anticipate needing to alter their upcoming conventions due to the COVID-19 pandemic. A week later, they announced a streaming program broadcast via Twitch called "Mischief From Home" that would begin with LeakyCon notables Jackson Bird and Mike Schubert, and include LeakyCon employee Promla Khosla and Anelli herself. Regularly scheduled programming included Wizard Rock Wednesdays.

On 5 June, LeakyCon announced that the 2020 conventions had been postponed due to COVID. New dates, for the same cities, were provided: 25–27 June 2021, for Orlando, and 29–31 October 2021, for Denver. Initially, Mischief Management announced that 2020 ticket holders would be allowed to transfer their ticket for a 2022 event if they would prefer, rather than a 2021 event. The 2021 conventions were also postponed, with a new date announced for Orlando for 29–31 July 2022, and for Denver for 14–16 October 2022. For anyone choosing not to keep their tickets, refunds were issued through 31 August 2021, with ticket holders also being offered the option of obtaining credit to any 2022 or 2023 Mischief Management original convention.

=== Rowling's transphobia ===
In December 2019, J. K. Rowling posted support for Maya Forstater, whose views were ruled in November 2019 by an employment tribunal in London to be "incompatible with human dignity and fundamental rights of others." On 6 June 2020, Rowling posted a series of Tweets that were publicly called out for being anti-trans. The week of 7 June 2020, Rowling posted an essay which unequivocally stated her position as being solidly against transgender persons.

Anelli told Variety that she found supporting Rowling "difficult", that the comments devastated her, and stated her disinterest in the Fantastic Beasts series of films as a result. On 2 July 2020, The Leaky Cauldron and MuggleNet released a joint statement, after consultation with GLAAD and The Trevor Project, denouncing Rowling's transphobia.

In February 2021, Anelli told IGN that Mischief Management intended to make sure attendees at their conferences knew that everyone was welcome and that "everyone is who they say they are". LeakyCon posted a statement on their website, updated on 9 November 2021, stating that they were opposed to the "fear and hatred" Rowling's posts spread regarding both the transgender and non-binary communities, as well as their commitment to inclusivity.

== 2022 ==
Some attendees at both Orlando and Denver had purchased tickets in 2019 or 2020 and kept them through COVID rescheduling. Podcasts Fanatical Fics and Where to Find Them, Potterless and the Wizarding Wireless Network of podcasts appeared at both LeakyCon events in 2022. The charity The Protego Foundation was also present at both conventions.

=== Orlando, Florida ===
The Orlando convention took place from 29 to 31 July 2022, at the Orange County Convention Center. Some attendees wore protective facemasks.

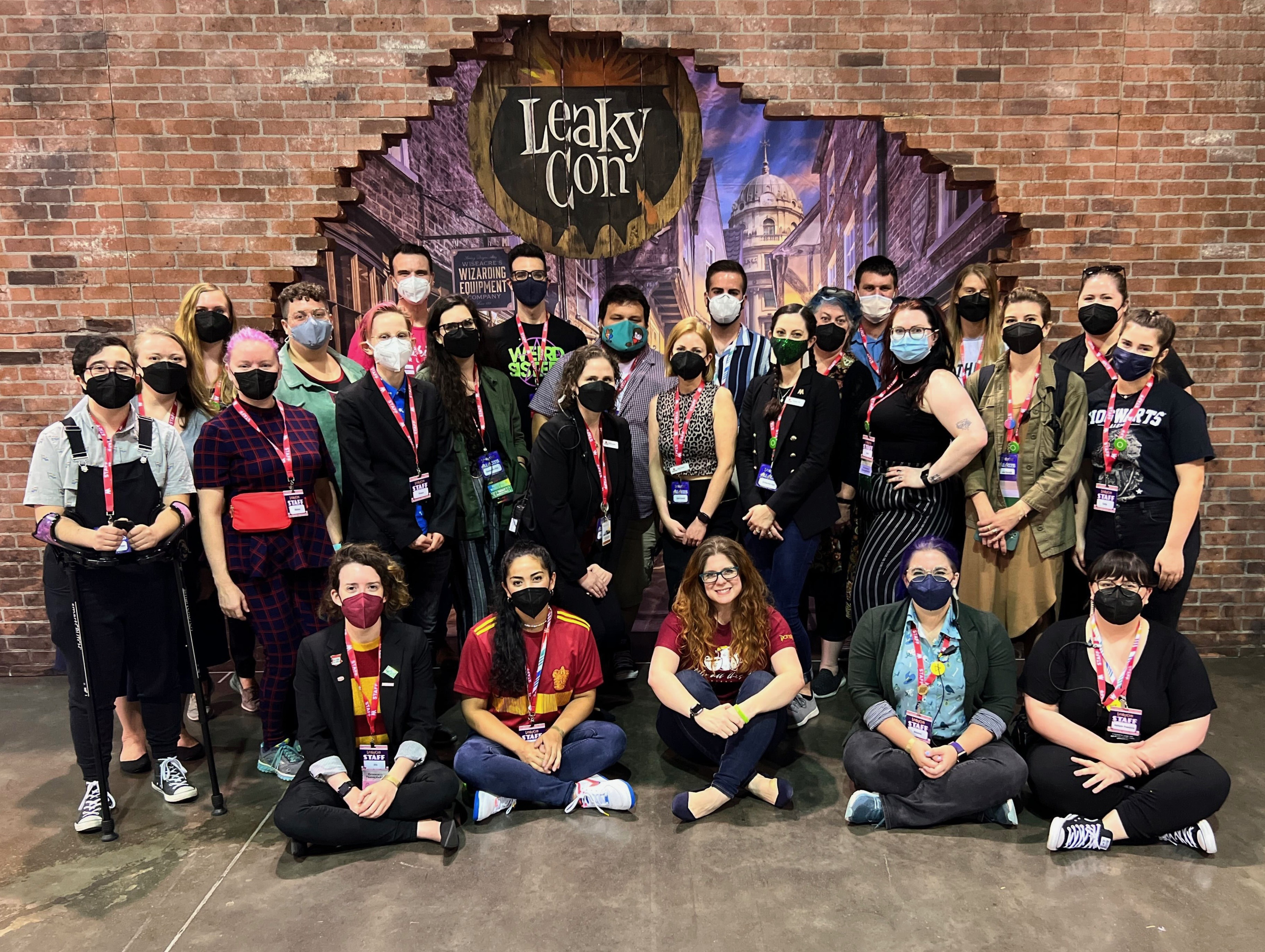
LeakyCon staff members at the Orange County Convention Center during LeakyCon Orlando on 31 July 2022.

Guests included Afshan Azad, Sean Biggerstaff, Bryn Court, Josh Herdman, Chris Rankin, Cherry Wallis, Chanel Williams, Stanislav Yanevski, and Trey Beachum. Devon Murray had been expected to attend, but had to cancel due to a medical situation. In addition to the other podcasts, Goblet of Wine and Pottership appeared at the Orlando convention. Wizarding rock performers at the event included Lauren Fairweather, Hawthorn and Holly, How Airplanes Fly, and Tonks and the Aurors. Author Darren Fink was present.

The theme for the convention was candy, with organisers using the colors of the trans pride flag on the signage borders in the shapes of candy canes. During one of the panels moderated by Mike Schubert, it was revealed that the vomit flavored Bertie Bott's Every Flavor Beans jelly bean was a previously failed Jelly Belly flavor intended to be pepperoni pizza.

Charities represented at the Orlando convention included The Little Petal Alliance, This Star Won't Go Out, and Transfiguring Adoption. On Sunday, 31 July, Universal notified The Protego Foundation that their petition to have butterbeer served without the topping had been granted, allowing for vegan butterbeer to be served on tap instead of only from the bottle.

Unlike previous years, the convention did not host a Quidditch game.

=== Denver, Colorado ===
The Denver convention took place from 14 to 16 October at the Crowne Plaza Denver Airport Convention Center. There were approximately 3,000 attendees on Saturday.

Guests included Sean Biggerstaff, Devon Murray, Chris Rankin, Tolga Safer, Luke Youngblood, Trey Beachum, Jakob Lovelady, and Stanislav Yanevski. In addition to the other podcasts, The Nerd Couple Show and Don't Call Me Crazy! were also present. Wizarding rock performers included Draco and the Malfoys, Dream Quaffle, The Weirdos are Out, and The Whomping Willows. Author Lorrie Kim was also present.

== 2023 ==
At the beginning of 2023, Anelli announced that LeakyCon would be distancing itself from being a Harry Potter convention with the slogan "More Fandoms, More Magic". Anelli stated that attendees could expect to see more content related to other fandoms such as Avatar: The Last Airbender, Buffy the Vampire Slayer, The Hunger Games, The Lord of the Rings, Percy Jackson & the Olympians, Supernatural, and Twilight, but also said that the designation as a Harry Potter convention remained "for ease and for marketing reasons".

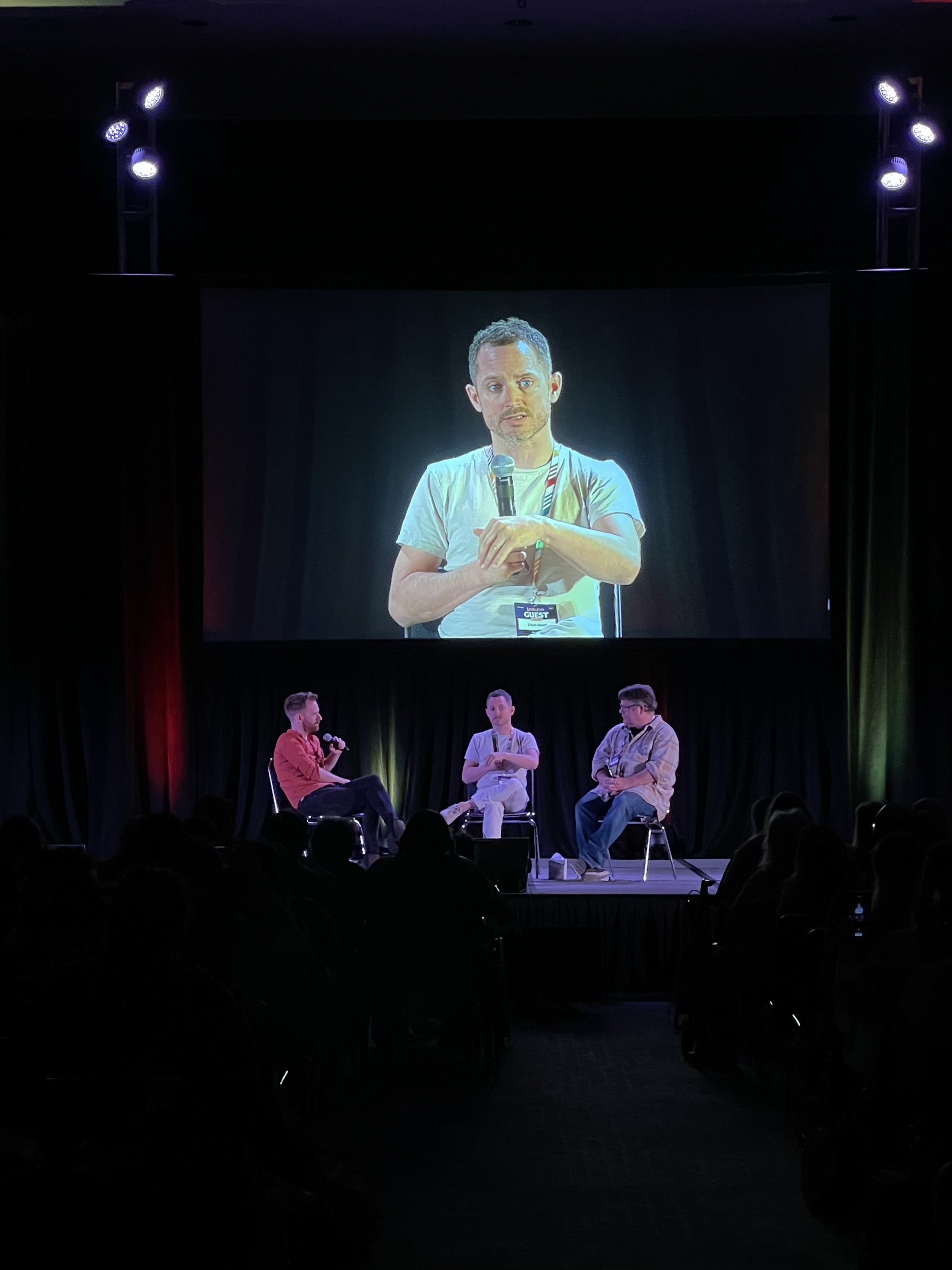
Chris Rankin interviewing Sean Astin and Elijah Wood during a LeakyCon Chicago panel in 2023.

The convention was held in Chicago, Illinois, 4–6 August at McCormick Place South, under the name "LeakyCon: Chicago Wizarding World's Fair". Guests included Sean Astin, Trey Beachum, Sean Biggerstaff, Ellie Darcey-Alden, Tom Felton, Rohan Gotobed, Walles Hamonde, Miranda Otto, James Payton, Chris Rankin, Em Wallbank, Chanel Williams, Stanislav Yanevski, Miltos Yerolemou, Kiran Shah, and Elijah Wood.

To show their support for SAG/AFTRA and WGA strikes taking place at the time, Astin and Wood chose not to speak to specific on-set experiences, instead giving fans insights into their personal histories. Rankin moderated the panel.

Music performers included Autumn Brooke, Hogwarts Therapist, Hawthorn and Holly, and The Weirdos Are Out for the wizarding rock cafe, with the concert featuring only Draco and the Malfoys and Lauren Fairweather. Tom Felton also gave a separate concert performance.

Authors included Nana Kay, Brittany Hanson and Lorrie Kim.

Podcasts present included Behind the Wand with Flick Miles; Potterless and The Newest Olympian with Mike Schubert; Fanatical Fics and Where to Find Them; MuggleCast; Potterversity; Puffcast; Shell Cottage Radio; Creating Magic; First Year Pod; Pottership; Swish and Flick; and WZRD Radio.

The Esther Earl Rocking Charity Ball was renamed to the LeakyCon Ball.

== 2024 ==
On 25 August 2023, LeakyCon announced that the 2024 convention would be held at the Oregon Convention Center in Portland, 5–7 July. Guests included Chris Rankin, Catherine Tate, Bonnie Wright, Stanislav Yanevski, Isaac Hempstead Wright, Team StarKid, Indira Varma, Em Wallbank, Chanel Williams, and Kit Young. Initial reporting stated attendance as 500, but was later updated to 2,800.

Several podcasts were present, including Fantasy Fangirls, MuggleCast, PotterCast, and Potterless. Musical performances included The Bookish Songs Collective, Geoff Hutton (known as Dream Quaffle) and Brian Ross. Rather than an evening event, the Friday wizarding rock performances were in a panel time slot at 5:00 PM. Outside of the convention proper, a wizarding rock concert was organized by Hawthorn and Holly at the Rose City Book Pub which took place the same night as the LeakyCon Ball.

Some vendors reported that the convention center required loading dock entry, atypical for LeakyCon, and that they had to resolve the situation of not even knowing where to be themselves, with no help from Mischief Management.

=== EnchantiCon ===
Regardless of Anelli's assertion in 2021 that LeakyCon would not change its name again, the convention rebranded as EnchantiCon, as announced at the final LeakyCon in July 2024. Guests, vendors and artists who had participated in past LeakyCons stated that they would not participate in an explicitly Harry Potter event, resulting in the name change.

Anelli described EnchantiCon as "a whole new world", stating that the intent behind the event is to give Harry Potter fans a space where they can celebrate their love for the series "without feeling like they were celebrating something that now represented something that was against their values." The announcement at the 2024 Portland LeakyCon stated that the name change would allow for the incorporation of even more Harry Potter content from those who were apprehensive of associating with Rowling's intellectual properties after her anti-trans comments.

== Sources ==
- "Due to the ongoing COVID-19 pandemic, LeakyCon Orlando and LeakyCon Denver have been rescheduled for 2022. We look forward to celebrating together in a safe and exciting way soon!" (Press release). LeakyCon. Archived from the original on 5 August 2021.
- "Esther Earl Obituary". The Patriot Ledger. 27 August 2010. Archived from the original on 18 August 2023 – via Legacy.com.
- "First wave of LeakyCon Lit Portland authors announced". MuggleNet. 21 March 2013. Archived from the original on 6 September 2015.
- "Fostering a Creative Community: The LeakyCon Academic Scholarship & LeakyCon Arts Fellowship". LeakyCon (Press release). Archived from the original on 9 February 2013.
- "The Girl Who Inspired 'The Fault In Our Stars' And A Network Of Friends". Here & Now. NPR. 5 March 2014. Gale A361139265.
- "Harry Potter Fan Convention 'LeakyCon' Coming To Denver In 2020". CBS News. 9 December 2019. Archived from the original on 22 July 2025.
- "Harry Potter Film Concept Art for Leakycon". ArtInsights (Press release). 10 January 2013. Archived from the original on 13 August 2014.
- "Hey College Students! LeakyCon is a conference that fosters learning, creativity and the magic that can come from doing what you love. That is why this year we are offering a $2500 Academic Scholarship to a student who embodies the LeakyCon spirit and is attending school to follow their dreams. To learn more and to apply, visit: LeakyCon.com/makemagic" (Press release). GeekyCon. 1 March 2013. Archived from the original on 23 April 2026 – via Facebook.
- "LeakyCon 2009: A Harry Potter Conference in Boston". The Funcooker. Student Life. St. Louis: Washington University. 26 May 2009. Archived from the original on 2 November 2024.
- "LeakyCon 2011: Live at the Leaky Cauldron II". Your Wizard Rock Source. 25 April 2023 [22 December 2016]. Archived from the original on 26 February 2026.
- "The LeakyCon 2011 ball is now officially called The Esther Earl Rocking Charity Ball. 🙂 More here leakycon.com" (Press release). LeakyCon2011. 4 October 2010. Archived from the original on 22 April 2026 – via Facebook.
- "LeakyCon 2011 is excited to announce our first ever Lit Day. Wednesday, July 13, 2011, we will be featuring many of the publishing industry's top authors, editors and agents in a one-day track of, well, book related awesomeness. And it is being run by author Maureen Johnson, who is also awesome in all ways. More details coming!" (Press release). LeakyCon2011. 7 June 2010. Archived from the original on 22 April 2026 – via Facebook.
- "LeakyCon 2013 is Going to ROCK! A Collection of the amazing acts appearing at our Portland and London Conferences" (Press release). GeekyCon. 7 March 2013 – via Facebook.
- "LeakyCon 2016: nouvelles informations!" [LeakyCon 2016: new information!]. La Gazette du Sorcier (in French). 2 September 2015. Archived from the original on 24 September 2020.
- LeakyCon 2017 | Highlights (Video). Suco de Mangá. 14 September 2017 – via YouTube.
- "LeakyCon 2017 Special Guests". LeakyCon (Press release). Archived from the original on 2 September 2017.
- "LeakyCon 2018 Special Guests". LeakyCon (Press release). Archived from the original on 3 August 2018.
- "LeakyCon: A Fan Conference. Chicago, Illinois. 9–12 August 2012". LeakyCon.
- "La LeakyCon annonce ses invités!" [LeakyCon announces guests!]. La Gazette du Sorcier (in French). 11 July 2019. Archived from the original on 1 October 2020.
- LeakyCon | Harry Potter convention in Denver this weekend. LeakyCon is the world's largest Harry Potter fan convention in the world (Video). KUSA (TV). 15 October 2022.
- "Leakycon: Chicago Wizarding World's Fair @ Hyatt Regency McCormick Place". Third Coast Review. 4 August 2023. Archived from the original on 4 August 2023.
- "LeakyCon Lands in Portland for Rose City Comic Con This September" (Press release). Linda Roth Associates. 31 July 2019. Archived from the original on 15 September 2019.
- "La leakycon London, c'est fini" [LeakyCon London has ended]. La Gazette du Sorcier (in French). 11 August 2013. Archived from the original on 4 March 2021.
- "La LeakyCon London va Wrocker!" [LeakyCon London is going to Wrock!]. La Gazette du Sorcier (in French). 7 March 2013. Archived from the original on 30 September 2020.
- "LeakyCon Orlando Adds Special Guest Lineup". Locked In Magazine. 8 February 2022. Archived from the original on 8 February 2022.
- ""LeakyCon Radio" Dedicated to Harry Potter Fans to Launch on SiriusXM". PR Newswire (Press release). SiriusXM. 12 June 2011. Archived from the original on 20 April 2026.
- ""LeakyCon Radio" Dedicated to Harry Potter Fans to Launch on SiriusXM" (Press release). Telecommunications Business. 27 July 2011. Gale A262352151.
- "LeakyCon Saturday add-ons · Catherine Tate · Chanel Williams · Chris Rankin · Em Wallbank · Indira Varma · Isaac Hempstead Wright · Kit Young · StarKid · Super Secret Harry Potter Actor" (Press release). LeakyCon. 14 May 2024 – via Facebook.
- "LeakyCon Schedule: LeakyCon First Annual Fittie 5K Run/Walk". sched.com. Archived from the original on 20 August 2019.
- "Limited Editions of Harry Potter Film Concept Art". ArtInsights (Press release). 10 January 2013. Archived from the original on 13 August 2014.
- "Live at the Leaky Cauldron: Wizard Rock from LeakyCon 2009". Your Wizard Rock Source. 26 April 2023 [9 March 2015]. Archived from the original on 3 February 2024.
- "The Lizzie Bennet Diaries is Going to be a Novel". LeakyNews. 28 June 2013. Archived from the original on 2 July 2013.
- "MinaLima prépare de nouveaux produits" [MinaLima is preparing new products]. La Gazette du Sorcier (in French). 6 August 2014. Archived from the original on 1 October 2020.
- "Mischief Management postpones 2020 events, announces new dates for 2021" (PDF) (Press release). Mischief Management. 5 June 2020. Archived from the original (PDF) on 29 September 2020.
- "More Than 5,000 Fans Expected at Sixth Annual LeakyCon For One of Fandom's Largest Celebrations of Everything Geeky" (Press release). The Honig Company, LLC. 18 February 2014. Archived from the original on 15 March 2025 – via Cision.
- "Noteworthy" (PDF). K-Statement. Vol. 31, no. 23. 25 June 2009. p. 3. Archived from the original (PDF) on 28 May 2010. "Karin Westman presented "Career Advice: Re-Imagining the School Story," LeakyCon 2009, May 23, Boston, Mass."
- "Photo Flash: HARRY POTTER AND THE PRISONER OF AZKABAN New Cover Art Revealed!". BroadwayWorld. 27 June 2013. Archived from the original on 21 April 2026.
- "Potter Puppet Pals coming to Orlando as part of Leakycon 2011". Attractions Magazine. 20 October 2010. Archived from the original on 5 July 2014.
- "Rose City Comic Con Announces Full Schedule of Events". TheNat20. 29 August 2019. Archived from the original on 12 April 2024.
- "Stars in the Parks: Luna Lovegood and Pansy Parkinson actresses visit Universal's Wizarding World". Attractions Magazine. 18 July 2011. Archived from the original on 3 July 2014.
- "A Statement from LeakyCon About J.K. Rowling". LeakyCon (Press release). 9 November 2021. Archived from the original on 27 November 2021.
- "Stillwater Books is proud to be the official book seller for this weekend's LeakyCon 2019 Boston!" (Press release). Stillwater Books. 23 September 2019 – via Facebook.
- "Team StarKid, Anthony Rapp, Amber Benson, and More to Appear at LeakyCon 2013, Beg. Today". BroadwayWorld. 27 June 2013. Archived from the original on 20 April 2026.
- "Team StarKid will offer premiere reading of third Harry Potter parody musical at LeakyCon in August". The Ann Arbor News. 17 June 2012. Archived from the original on 19 July 2012.
- "Top YA Authors Meet Fans at LeakyCon 2014, Now thru 8/3". BroadwayWorld. 30 June 2014. Archived from the original on 21 April 2026.
- "Une convention Harry Potter à venir à Los Angeles" [A Harry Potter convention is coming to Los Angeles]. La Gazette du Sorcier (in French). 15 April 2014. Archived from the original on 19 September 2020.
- "We are actively and continually monitoring the COVID-19 outbreak and do not currently anticipate any changes or delays to our 2020 event lineup" (Press release). Mischief Management. 11 March 2020. Archived from the original on 21 April 2026 – via Facebook.
- "We're just as sane as she is 😉 Please welcome Luna Lovegood actor Evanna Lynch to #LeakyCon Denver! Autograph and photograph experiences will be available to add on to your ticket this Friday ✨ leakycon.com [UPDATE:] Due to a personal obligation, Evanna is no longer able to join us at LeakyCon Orlando. She will be switching her appearance to Denver. Stay tuned for fun Orlando announcements coming soon! To transfer purchased Orlando tickets to Denver, please email help@leakycon.com ✨" (Press release). LeakyCon. 4 March 2020. Archived from the original on 21 April 2026 – via Facebook.
- "We're kicking off #MischiefFromHome with some of your fandom faves ❤️ Join Jackson Bird, Proma Khosla, Melissa Anelli, and Mike Schubert for a fun-filled live show!" (Press release). Mischief Management. 18 March 2020. Archived from the original on 21 April 2026 – via Facebook.
- "Wizard Rock FAQ". Wizrocklopedia. Archived from the original on 7 May 2021.
- "Le Wizard Rock sera à l'honneur à la LeakyCon!" [Wizard Rock will have a place of honor at LeakyCon!]. La Gazette du Sorcier (in French). 7 April 2017. Archived from the original on 22 September 2020.
- "The Wizarding World Of Harry Potter Descends On Dublin". Today FM. 1 September 2017. Archived from the original on 27 April 2026.
- "Wizarding World of Harry Potter will be 'Open at the Close' for special fan event". Attractions Magazine. 16 May 2011. Archived from the original on 5 July 2014.
- Allie and Cass (13 September 2024). "10: LeakyCon 2024 Recap (and we're back!)". Biscuits and Broomsticks (Podcast).
- Allie and Cass (15 September 2023). "LeakyCon 2023 Recap". Biscuits and Broomsticks (Podcast).
- Audrey and Katie (16 October 2019). "LeakyCon Review!!". Wizard Studies: Perusing All Things Potter (Podcast).
- Bess (1 September 2020). "Episode 11: Dragons and Beasts (transcript)". WZRD Radio (Podcast). Archived from the original on 16 October 2021.
- Bess (1 July 2022). "Episode 53: In Which I Kick Harry Potter in the Face (transcript)". WZRD Radio Podcast (Podcast).
- Bess (1 October 2022). "Episode 59: Nerve (transcript)". WZRD Radio (Podcast). Archived from the original on 1 October 2022.
- Bess and DQ (1 September 2025). "Episode 126: Like a Death Eater". WZRD Radio (Podcast).
- Brad A. (28 May 2010). "LeakyCon Remembrance, Day 1: Evil Night!". Wizrocklopedia.org. Archived from the original on 5 April 2024.
- Brad A. (29 May 2010). "LeakyCon Remembrance, Day 2: Wizard Rock Night". Wizrocklopedia.org. Archived from the original on 5 April 2024.
- Brad A. (30 May 2010). "LeakyCon Remembrance, Day 3: Wizard Rock in the Afternoon". Wizrocklopedia.org. Archived from the original on 5 April 2024.
- Dani (11 August 2022). "LeakyCon Orlando Recap". Creating Magic (Podcast).
- Dani and Paula (25 April 2025). "Enchanticon with Melissa". Creating Magic (Podcast).
- Dani and Steven (2 September 2021). "Melissa Anelli". Creating Magic (Podcast).
- Entmaiden (8 August 2023). greendragon (ed.). "A report from LeakyCon – Elijah Wood, Sean Astin and more!". TheOneRing.net. Archived from the original on 9 August 2023.
- Ezra and Lottie (14 August 2023). "Harry Potter Hangout: LeakyCon 2023". Shell Cottage Radio (Podcast).
- Ipiutiminelle (8 September 2019). "La LeakyCon Boston dévoile son programme!" [LeakyCon Boston unveils its program!]. La Gazette du Sorcier (in French). Archived from the original on 1 October 2020.
- Ipiutiminelle (4 July 2014). "LeakyCon Orlando 2014, un programme chargé!" [LeakyCon Orlando 2014: A Busy Schedule!]. La Gazette du Sorcier (in French). Archived from the original on 6 August 2020.
- Jordan (24 July 2014). "Anna Lore and Steve Zaragoza of Frankenstein M.D. to appear at LeakyCon!". LeakyCon (Press release). Archived from the original on 19 August 2014.
- Kellsie and Samantha (16 July 2024). "Episode 34 - Fourth Wing - Chapter 31: Part 2". The Readers Quadrant (Podcast).
- Lys (21 February 2023). "La LeakyCon, première convention Harry Potter au monde, se renouvèle" [LeakyCon, the world's premier Harry Potter convention, reinvents itself]. La Gazette du Sorcier (in French). Archived from the original on 26 May 2024.
- OdionProductions (27 October 2016). LeakyCon | Charlotte Skeoch & Nick Shirm | Marriott Burbank, CA | October 21, 2016 – via YouTube.
- Pantalaemon (22 August 2013). "La LeakyCon, compte-rendu d'un week-end, jours 1 et 1bis" [LeakyCon, weekend recap, days 1 and 1.5]. La Gazette du Sorcier (in French). Archived from the original on 6 August 2020.
- Pantalaemon (3 April 2018). "LeakyCon 2017 à Dublin: compte-rendu de la meilleure convention Harry Potter" [LeakyCon 2017 in Dublin: Recap of the best Harry Potter convention]. La Gazette du Sorcier (in French). Archived from the original on 1 October 2020.
- Paula and Dani (9 March 2023). "Mischief Management". Creating Magic (Podcast).
- "Leakycon Chicago Recap!". Creating Magic (Podcast). 31 August 2023.
- Rachael D (3 August 2022). "Wizard Rock Is Alive and Well and Thriving at LeakyCon". MuggleNet. Archived from the original on 4 August 2022.
- Retta and Michelle (14 January 2023). "#5: Favorite Fan Experiences". Gryffindor Common Room (Podcast).
- Retta and Michelle (10 July 2023). "LeakyCon 2023 Preview". Gryffindor Common Room (Podcast).
- selfwindingwriter (26 July 2011). LeakyCon Room of Requirement - Hawthorn & Holly - La La Luna (Video).
- Sue (12 July 2008). "Dance the Night Away, Leaky Con and Wizard Wrock Style at Terminus". The Leaky Cauldron (Press release). Archived from the original on 17 March 2018.
- Sue (29 March 2009). "LeakyCon 2009 Keynote Speaker Announcement: Nosh Time with the Nerdfighters!". The Leaky Cauldron (Press release). Archived from the original on 26 September 2015.
- Thræn (31 October 2019). "Matt London at LeakyCon: Writing Hogwarts Mystery". GamePress. Archived from the original on 13 November 2019.
- Thræn (26 October 2019). "Recap: LeakyCon Boston 2019". GamePress. Archived from the original on 13 November 2019.
- Anelli, Melissa (7 April 2017). "Dear beloved GeekyCon community". Tumblr (Press release). Archived from the original on 19 June 2018.
- Anelli, Melissa (20 May 2009). "Five Days Left to Order Wizard Rock Live Album from LeakyCon". The Leaky Cauldron (Press release). Archived from the original on 14 October 2012.
- Anelli, Melissa (31 August 2017). "Geek Ireland Meets - Melissa Anelli, CEO of LeakyCon". Geek Ireland (Interview). Interviewed by Olivia Fahy. Archived from the original on 12 October 2017.
- Anelli, Melissa (18 July 2014). "How I Started a Con with No Experience". Tumblr. Archived from the original on 17 April 2026.
- Anelli, Melissa (4 January 2025). "Inside the Magic of Fandom Conventions". Muse by Clio (Interview). Interviewed by Damian Bazadona. Archived from the original on 14 January 2025.
- Anelli, Melissa (1 October 2016). "Introducing: The LeakyCon Park Event". The Leaky Cauldron (Press release). Archived from the original on 7 October 2016.
- Anelli, Melissa (10 July 2012). "Introducing Charity Row". LeakyCon (Press release). Archived from the original on 15 July 2012.
- Anelli, Melissa (26 April 2009). "LeakyCon 2009 Keynote: Editors and Authors Discussion with Cheryl Klein and John Green". The Leaky Cauldron (Press release). Archived from the original on 28 April 2009.
- Anelli, Melissa (19 August 2016). "The Mudbloods, The Parselmouths to Reunite at LeakyCon 2016! See the Full Wizard Rock Lineup". The Leaky Cauldron (Press release). Archived from the original on 30 August 2016.
- Anelli, Melissa (11 May 2009). "Potter Puppet Pals Performing at LeakyCon!". The Leaky Cauldron (Press release). Archived from the original on 5 July 2009.
- Aneli, Melissa (13 September 2016). "Relive LeakyCon 2011 With Our Live Wizard Rock Album". The Leaky Cauldron (Press release). Archived from the original on 7 October 2016.
- Anelli, Melissa (29 April 2009). Signed HP Books Preview - LeakyCon Exclusive (Video). PotterCast – via YouTube.
- Anelli, Melissa (12 September 2016). "Special Guest Recap: Who You'll See at LeakyCon 2016". The Leaky Cauldron (Press release). Archived from the original on 7 October 2016.
- Anelli, Melissa (20 May 2013). "Win an AVPSY LeakyCon Prop!". LeakyNews (Press release). Archived from the original on 14 June 2013.
- Armstrong, Jordan (2 November 2017). "'Harry Potter' convention coming to Dallas in 2018". KHOU. Archived from the original on 25 April 2026.
- Åslund, Louise; Nyberg, Magdalena (2014). "Fighting freakin' Voldemort": En kvalitativ studie om hur The Harry Potter Alliance kommunicerar med sin målgrupp [A qualitative study on how The Harry Potter Alliance communicates with its target audience] (PDF) (Bachelor's thesis) (in Swedish). Mid Sweden University. Archived from the original on 15 September 2024.
- Baker-Whitelaw, Gavia (12 August 2013). "At LeakyCon, Hank Green is bigger than Harry Potter". The Daily Dot. Archived from the original on 15 July 2014.
- Bancroft, Colette (25 July 2011) [24 July 2011]. "Harry Potter and the Long Goodbye". Tampa Bay Times. Archived from the original on 19 April 2026.
- Barbieri, Alyssa (20 May 2013). "New footage from 'THE MORTAL INSTRUMENTS: CITY OF BONES' to be shown at LeakyCon". TMI Source. Archived from the original on 17 June 2013.
- Bell, Amy (31 August 2017). "LeakyCon 2017: Here's Why This Weekend Is The Ultimate Treat For Harry Potter Fans In Dublin". LovinDublin. Archived from the original on 11 September 2017.
- Bennett, Alanna (20 November 2016). "The Harry Potter Fandom Is At A Crossroads". BuzzFeed News. Archived from the original on 20 November 2016. "That notion was present and accounted for at the 2016 LeakyCon, held this past October in Burbank, California."
- Bierly, Mandi (18 July 2012). "LeakyCon to debut 'A Very Potter 3D' with Darren Criss". Entertainment Weekly. Archived from the original on 10 March 2015.
- Blaskovich, Sarah (12 August 2019). "Harry Potter convention in Dallas brought mischievous fans to one magical place". The Dallas Morning News. Archived from the original on 23 September 2019.
- Bondi, Gabrielle (14 August 2012). "LeakyCon 2012: I Was a Teenage Writer & Team Starkid's AVPSY". The Young Folks. Archived from the original on 17 August 2019.
- Borrelli, Christopher (23 August 2021) [12 August 2012]. "Harry Potter fans create magic at LeakyCon". Chicago Tribune. Archived from the original on 18 April 2026.
- Boughey, Lynn M.; Earnest, Peter (2014). Harry Potter and the Art of Spying. Minneapolis: Wise Ink, Inc. ISBN 9781940014173. OCLC 1245894345. OL 32150393M.
- Brigante, Ricky (4 August 2014). "Best of LeakyCon 2014 cosplay from fans of Harry Potter, Doctor Who, Frozen, Marvel, and more in Orlando convention". Inside the Magic. Archived from the original on 14 August 2020.
- Brown, Kelly (28 July 2014). "LeakyCon kicks off this week to celebrate geekiness, including: Harry Potter, Doctor Who, and others". Behind the Thrills. Archived from the original on 12 June 2025.
- Brown, Ruth (23 August 2012). "Willamette Geek: Harry Potter Convention Coming to Portland". Willamette Week. Archived from the original on 2 May 2026.
- Busis, Hillary (21 August 2012). "Darren Criss and Team Starkid return to Hogwarts -- VIDEO". Entertainment Weekly. Archived from the original on 22 August 2012.
- Carchidi, Jim (24 April 2014). "Harry Potter fans to make Orlando hotel rooms disappear for LeakyCon 2014". Orlando Business Journal. Archived from the original on 1 May 2014.
- Carter, Jessie (26 August 2014). "Let's Geek Out: SLJ Goes to Fifth Annual LeakyCon". School Library Journal. Archived from the original on 22 April 2026.
- Carvelli, April (21 July 2023). "[Convention] LeakyCon Chicago (August 4-6, 2023)". PopCultHQ. Archived from the original on 22 April 2024.
- Cassidy, Charlotte; Cassidy, Mitchell; Kelley, Elliot; Rizza, Kevin; Turley, Alie; Turley, Mike (18 August 2023). "LeakyCon 2023 & Book Five Wrap-up!". Why Can't We Be Wizards (Podcast).
- Chen, Rachel; Williams, Luke A. (16 October 2019). "When Fandom Becomes Family". The Harvard Crimson. photographer: Gajarawala, Ryan N. Archived from the original on 25 March 2021.
- Coats, Stephanie (18 June 2013). "Team Starkid, Tom Lenk, Amber Benson and More Set for LeakyCon 2013". The Flickcast. Archived from the original on 16 April 2014.
- Coffey, Laura T. (28 June 2013). "Presto chango! 'Harry Potter' books get edgy new covers". Today. Archived from the original on 25 July 2021. "This new book cover for the third Harry Potter novel was unveiled in Portland, Ore., at the LeakyCon Convention, an event for Harry Potter fans."
- Corbett, Sue (25 February 2013). "The queen of teen: Maureen Johnson". Publishers Weekly. Vol. 260, no. 8. p. 26. Gale A320734186.
- Davis, Audri (1 September 2015). "Official Dates for LeakyCon 2016 Announced". GeekyNews (Press release). Archived from the original on 2 September 2015.
- Davis, Bayana; Jordan, Robyn-Renée; Patterson-Hurst, Porshèa (20 August 2018). "Episode 155 and 3/4 – LeakyCon 2018 Recap". #WizardTeam (Podcast).
- Davis-Friedman, Samantha (31 March 2022). "Celebrate the magic of Harry Potter at LeakyCon 2022 in Orlando". Attractions Magazine. Archived from the original on 31 March 2022.
- De Groot, Kristen (16 June 2018). "Warner Bros. crackdown puts Dark Mark over Potter festivals". Associated Press. Archived from the original on 27 October 2020.
- Donnelly, Erin (19 September 2017). "Inside LeakyCon, The Progressive Convention For Harry Potter Fans". Refinery29. Archived from the original on 20 April 2026.
- Dunne, Samantha (7 April 2022). "Accio Harry Potter fans: LeakyCon coming to Orlando this July". WKMG-TV. Archived from the original on 8 April 2022.
- Dunne, Samantha (25 July 2022). "Magic is in the air at Harry Potter-themed LeakyCon in Orlando". WKMG-TV. Archived from the original on 25 July 2022.
- Earl, Esther Grace; Earl, Lori; Earl, Wayne (2014). This Star Won't Go Out: The Life and Words of Esther Grace Earl. New York: Dutton Books for Young Readers. ISBN 9780525426363.
- Ellis, Jordan (15 August 2018). "Episode 032: LIVE from LeakyCon with Taekia Blackwell (description)". The Sartorial Geek (Podcast).
- England, Amanda (24 August 2019). "9¾ things we learned at LeakyCon!". Hollywood News Source. Archived from the original on 23 September 2019.
- Errens, Julia (19 August 2013). "Don't Let the Muggles Get You Down: A LeakyCon Story". Themarysue.com. Archived from the original on 19 August 2013.
- Erzen, Tanya (2012). Fanpire: The Twilight Saga and the Women Who Love It. Boston: Beacon Press. ISBN 9780807006337. LCCN 2012013959.
- Fahy, Olivia (28 July 2017). "Schedule for LeakyCon 2017 is a Harry Potter Fan's Dream". Geek Ireland. Archived from the original on 19 September 2017.
- Fairweather, Lauren (22 August 2013). Heaven is a street in London (LeakyCon 2013) (Video) – via YouTube.
- Faniel, Corentin (9 October 2023). "Séparer la femme de l'artiste? Les fans face à J.K. Rowling, d'abord adulée, aujourd'hui conspuée" [Separating the woman from the artist? Fans confront J.K. Rowling, once adored, now reviled]. Télérama (Interview) (in French). Interviewed by Mathilde Loire. Archived from the original on 24 April 2026.
- Flax, Shoshana (May–June 2016). "Was Jo March a Ravenclaw? Authors, fans, and who makes the rules". The Horn Book Magazine. Vol. 92, no. 3. pp. 48–53. Gale A453290610.
- Fletcher, Sandra (18 August 2005). "Autographs, actors and Klingons". Tewksbury Wilmington Advocate. Archived from the original on 27 April 2026.
- Forgey, Hope (3 November 2022). "LeakyCon Denver 2022: Mile-High Fandom Fun". MuggleNet. Archived from the original on 1 November 2022.
- Fox, Jane (12 August 2012). "Unity, friendship and charity shine during annual Harry Potter conference, LeakyCon". The DePaulia. Archived from the original on 24 April 2026.
- Gallivan, Joseph (3 July 2013). "LeakyCon feels like teen spirit". Portland Tribune. Archived from the original on 2 May 2014.
- Garcia, Stephanie (4 August 2014). "LeakyCon casts a spell on Orlando". Orlando Weekly. Archived from the original on 22 April 2026.
- Garrick, Josh (25 July 2014). "Culture for Your Calendar". Seminole Voice. Vol. 24, no. 30. p. 10.
- Goetz, Sharon K., ed. (2010). Terminus: Collected Papers on Harry Potter, 7–11 August 2008. Sedalia, CO: Narrate Conferences, Inc.
- Green, Hank; Green, John (2010). "VidCon 2010 Program" (PDF). vidcon.co.uk. Archived from the original (PDF) on 8 July 2011.
- Grossman, Lev (27 May 2009). "A Very Late LeakyCon Report". Techland. Time. Archived from the original on 10 April 2012.
- Gunn, Callum (20 October 2019). "Fantastic Beasts 3 filming to begin in February 2020 say Dan Fogler". Cultresss. Archived from the original on 9 March 2022.
- Gunn, Callum (29 July 2018). "Fantastic Beasts No-Maj Dan Fogler is off to LeakyCon". Culturess. Archived from the original on 20 June 2024.
- Gunn, Callum (15 September 2019). "LeakyCon Boston 2019: Potter Puppet Pals, Tonks and the Aurors and more". Culturess. Archived from the original on 6 August 2024.
- Hall, Catherine (24 March 2020). “Hogwarts Will Always Be There to Welcome You Home”: Immersion, Belonging, and Activism in the Wizard Rock Musical Community (PhD thesis). Florida State University.
- Hannon, Melissa (24 July 2019). "LeakyCon Dallas Adds Authors Angie Thomas, Julie Murphy, and more". Horror Geek Life. Archived from the original on 27 November 2020.
- Hawk, Keith (19 June 2012). "'Harry Potter' actor Louis Cordice will be a special guest at LeakyCon 2012 in Chicago". MuggleNet. Archived from the original on 5 September 2015.
- Hawk, Keith (24 January 2012). "LeakyCon 2012 Special announcement: Evanna Lynch and Scarlett Byrne confirmed". MuggleNet. Archived from the original on 17 July 2014.
- Hawk, Keith (31 August 2012). "LeakyCon London 2013 registration is NOW OPEN!". MuggleNet. Archived from the original on 6 September 2015.
- Hawk, Keith (5 August 2013). "Lumos and LeakyCon Bring Charity Magic to London this week". MuggleNet. Archived from the original on 6 September 2015.
- Hayashi, Aya Esther (February 2018). Musicking, Discourse, and Identity in Participatory Media Fandom (PhD thesis). City University of New York.
- Henderson, Danielle (28 July 2015). "Can GeekyCon's Founder Change Fandom For The Better?". BuzzFeed News. Archived from the original on 19 December 2018.
- Holder, Sarah Frances (August 2017). "Get Your Geek On": Online and Offline Representations of Audiotopia within the GeekyCon Community (Master's thesis). University of Tennessee, Knoxville.
- Jacobs, Julia (12 June 2020). "Harry Potter Fans Reimagine Their World Without Its Creator". The New York Times. Archived from the original on 20 August 2025.
- Johnson, Dawn (21 May 2019). "Get Ready to Wrock at LeakyCon 2019 Dallas and Boston!". The Leaky Cauldron (Press release). Archived from the original on 25 May 2019.
- Johnson, Dawn (31 July 2019). "LeakyCon Comes to Rose City Comic Con in September!". The Leaky Cauldron (Press release). Archived from the original on 23 August 2019.
- Khosla, Proma (15 October 2016). "How Harry Potter conventions took over my life". Mashable. Archived from the original on 24 May 2022.
- Kligler-Vilenchik, Neta (2016). "Decreasing World Suck: Harnessing Popular Culture for Fan Activism". In Sefton-Green, Julian (ed.). By Any Media Necessary — The New Youth Activism. Connected Youth and Digital Futures. New York: New York University Press. doi:10.18574/nyu/9781479829712.001.0001. ISBN 9781479899982. JSTOR j.ctt180401m.
- King, Lillian (24 July 2024) [21 July 2024]. "Mischief managed: 'Harry Potter' musicians fight back at last LeakyCon". The Blade. Archived from the original on 22 July 2024.
- Kirk, Amanda (5 June 2020). "LeakyCon Orlando and Denver postponed due to pandemic". The Leaky Cauldron (Press release). Archived from the original on 10 June 2020.
- Kondolojy, Amanda (29 July 2022). "LeakyCon to celebrate all things 'Harry Potter' with panels, celebrities and more". Orlando Sentinel. Archived from the original on 22 April 2026.
- Kreinin Souccar, Miriam (15 January 2018). "A pro at cons; This writer taps pop culture to produce conventions that give fans a place to indulge". Crain's New York. Vol. 34, no. 3. p. 60. Gale A523607004.
- LaCour, Brad (7 August 2019). "Should You Go to Harry Potter Convention LeakyCon?". Dallas Observer. Archived from the original on 23 April 2026.
- Lannaman, Ned (31 May 2013). "Video Vriday! Sun Angle, Radiation City, the Doubleclicks, UMO". Portland Mercury. Archived from the original on 2 May 2026.
- Lee, Banks (11 July 2014). "Avoid the Diagon Alley crowds by attending Leakycon's private Wizarding World party". Attractions Magazine. Archived from the original on 10 October 2015.
- Liu, Jonathan H. (26 June 2013). "LeakyCon 2013 Hits Portland Tomorrow". GeekDad. Archived from the original on 6 March 2021.
- Liu, Jonathan H. (27 June 2013). "Third New Harry Potter Cover Revealed at LeakyCon". GeekDad. Archived from the original on 24 April 2026.
- Maher, Kevin (11 July 2012). "Beyond Comic Con: 8 Great Pop Culture Gatherings to Attend This Summer". The FW. Archived from the original on 14 July 2012.
- Martens, Marianne (June 2019). Rayner, Samantha; Lyons, Rebecca (eds.). The Forever Fandom of Harry Potter: Balancing Fan Agency and Corporate Control. Elements in Publishing and Book Culture. Cambridge: Cambridge University Press. ISBN 9781108469883.
- Matthews, Tarra (19 May 2013). "Warblers CONFIRMED For LeakyCon Portland". PopWrapped. Archived from the original on 23 April 2026.
- Mazur, Josh (15 August 2019). "[Watch] Can LeakyCon Attendees Identify Harry Potter Spells?". Central Track. Archived from the original on 20 August 2019.
- McCracken, Allison (6 August 2013). "From LGBT to GSM: Gender and Sexual Identity among LeakyCon's Queer Youth (LeakyCon Portland)". Antenna. University of Wisconsin–Madison. Archived from the original on 17 August 2013.
- McCracken, Allison; Kelly, Jen (5 August 2015). "Report from GeekyCon, Orlando, July 30-August 2: The Challenges of Rebranding a Feminist Con". Antenna. Archived from the original on 27 April 2026.
- McCracken, Allison; Stein, Louisa (29 July 2013). "LeakyCon Portland: Where the Fangirls Are". Antenna. University of Wisconsin–Madison. Archived from the original on 10 September 2015.
- McGettigan, Grace (10 August 2017). "Harry Potter Fan? These Famous Faces Are Coming To Dublin For This Year's LeakyCon Festival". Stellar. Archived from the original on 7 March 2019.
- Miller, Heidi; Miller, Ella (19 August 2018). "Episode 22: LeakyCon 2018". Glamdom Fandom (Podcast).
- Miller, Laura (11 September 2016). "The New Powers That Be". Slate. Archived from the original on 21 August 2019.
- Minassian, Liana (24 October 2016). "Harry Potter Fan Fest LeakyCon Takes Over Burbank". LA Weekly. Archived from the original on 24 October 2020.
- Moore, Roger (15 July 2011). "How Harry Potter Changed the World". Saipan Tribune. Vol. 21, no. 166. The Orlando Sentinel. p. 27.
- Morales, Claudia (18 November 2016). "11 Wizard Rock Songs to Get You Excited for Fantastic Beasts and Where to Find Them". Paste. Archived from the original on 19 October 2021.
- Moreau, Jordan (6 June 2020). "J.K. Rowling Gets Backlash Over Anti-Trans Tweets". Variety. Archived from the original on 7 June 2020.
- Murphy, J. Kim (2 July 2020). "'Harry Potter' Fan Sites Will Minimize Future J.K. Rowling Coverage After Condemning Anti-Trans Views". Variety. Archived from the original on 25 February 2025.
- Murray, Rebecca (22 June 2011). "Evanna Lynch to Appear at LeakyCon 2011". Showbiz Junkies (Press release). Archived from the original on 25 August 2019.
- Navarro, Linda (12 October 2022). "12 weekend things to do around Colorado Springs and beyond: Harry Potter, Space4Fun Day, World Singing Day, Blues Challenge, birding 101, Halloween events, Rail Fair". The Gazette. Archived from the original on 13 October 2022.
- O'Brien, Megan (7 October 2019). "3 things to know about the 'Harry Potter' fan convention LeakyCon". Boston.com. Archived from the original on 8 October 2019.
- O'Malley, Tiffany; Petras, Katie; Petras, Megan (13 August 2023). "Bonus Episode: Let's Talk LeakyCon Chicago 2023!". Swish and Flick (Podcast). Event occurs at 3:22–4:34.
- O'Phelan, Sarah (24 October 2022). "LeakyCon Denver 2022: Day 2 Recap". MuggleNet. Archived from the original on 24 October 2022.
- Osborne, Ryan (6 December 2017). "Harry Potter convention sells out, moves to larger Dallas venue". Fort Worth Star-Telegram. Archived from the original on 25 April 2026.
- Page, Jenn; Curtis, John (21 October 2022). "Check Out Jenn Page & John Curtis's Story". VoyageLA (Interview). Archived from the original on 9 December 2025.
- Pandey, Kavi Shekhar (2 November 2011). "The StarKids Are All Right: The rise of a 'U' theater troupe from the Basement to the national stage". The Michigan Daily. Archived from the original on 21 April 2021.
- Parke, Maggie (September 2012). Incorporating and considering fans: fan culture in event film adaptations (PhD thesis). Bangor University.
- Peele, Britton (5 December 2017). "Dallas 'Harry Potter' convention LeakyCon is moving, getting bigger, offering more tickets". The Dallas Morning News. Archived from the original on 9 November 2020.
- Peele, Britton (19 June 2018). "Don't worry, 'Harry Potter' fan convention LeakyCon is still coming to Dallas". The Dallas Morning News. Archived from the original on 6 March 2020.
- Peele, Britton (2 August 2018). "'Harry Potter' convention LeakyCon will return to Dallas in 2019; tickets are on sale now". The Dallas Morning News. Archived from the original on 10 December 2019.
- Peele, Britton (12 August 2018). "'Harry Potter' fan convention LeakyCon brought stars, fun and crowds to a magical Dallas event". The Dallas Morning News. Archived from the original on 6 March 2020.
- Peele, Britton (25 July 2019). "'Harry Potter' star Tom Felton coming to Dallas as a LeakyCon special guest". The Dallas Morning News. Archived from the original on 18 November 2019.
- Peele, Britton (1 November 2017). "There's a big 'Harry Potter' convention coming to Dallas in 2018". The Dallas Morning News. Archived from the original on 6 October 2022.
- Petras, Katie; Petras, Megan (23 October 2022). "BONUS Episode - LeakyCon Denver 2022!". Swish and Flick (Podcast).
- Petras, Katie; Petras, Megan (31 July 2022). "Episode 254 – LeakyCon 2022 in Orlando!". Swish and Flick (Podcast).
- Petras, Katie; Petras, Megan (25 September 2020). LeakyCon Boston Day 2!. Swish and Flick – via YouTube.
- Pocock, Emma (28 February 2020). "'Harry Potter' Actors Stan Yanevski & Josh Herdman Join LeakyCon Orlando!". The Leaky Cauldron (Press release). Archived from the original on 6 April 2020.
- Pocock, Emma (14 March 2018). "Lee Jordan's Coming to LeakyCon 2018!". The Leaky Cauldron (Press release). Archived from the original on 14 March 2018.
- Pocock, Emma (19 June 2018). "Scarlett Byrne and Louis Cordice Confirmed for LeakyCon 2018!". The Leaky Cauldron (Press release). Archived from the original on 26 August 2018.
- Poolos, Christine (2015). John Green. All About the Authors. New York: Rosen Publishing. ISBN 9781477779040. LCCN 2014007271.
- Potter, Payton (2 November 2017). "Good News, Harry Potter Fans — LeakyCon Is Coming To Dallas". Patch Media. Archived from the original on 3 November 2017.
- Reid, Sophie (16 April 2014). "LeakyCon 2016 announced!". MuggleNet. Archived from the original on 16 April 2014.
- Rogo, Paula (14 July 2011). ""Potter" fans hope to keep magic alive after movie". Today. Reuters. Archived from the original on 25 March 2023.
- Rubin, Mallory; Concepcion, Jason (23 August 2018). "HP Extra: Live From LeakyCon 2018 — Chris Rankin on Portraying Percy Weasley and His Life After 'Harry Potter' | Harry Potter (description)". Binge Mode (Podcast). The Ringer.
- Salem, Alia (18 August 2019). "3 hijabi women led a panel discussion at LeakyCon and magic ensued". The Dallas Morning News. Archived from the original on 17 September 2019.
- Sandler, Brian (12 August 2018). "Harry Potter convention a (much) bigger deal than expected in Big D". KDAF. Archived from the original on 8 November 2021.
- Schillaci, Sophie (12 July 2011). "Harry Potter Radio Station to Launch on Sirius XM". The Hollywood Reporter.
- Schubert, Mike (20 July 2020). "Ep. 135 - A Very Potter Senior Year Act 1 (Part 1) w/ Melissa Anelli". Potterless (Podcast).
- Scull, Eric; Tannenbaum, Micah; Tee, Laura (16 July 2024). "A Face Only Bellatrix Could Love (transcript)". MuggleCast (Podcast). Archived from the original on 8 August 2024.
- Singh, Jasneet (5 March 2025). "There's a Reason Colin Creevey Disappeared From the Harry Potter Movies, and It Actually Makes Sense". Collider. Archived from the original on 7 April 2025.
- Smallsreed, Susan (Summer 2013). "LeakyCon 2013" (PDF). Oregon Young Adult Network. Archived (PDF) from the original on 10 June 2024.
- Snow, Michelle (7 August 2014). "Popular LeakyCon Rebrands as GeekyCon; Returns to Orlando in 2015". City Surfing Orlando. Archived from the original on 15 August 2014.
- Sorrells, Mitra (20 July 2011). "Harry Potter Convention by Fans, for Fans Raises $120,000 for Charity". Biz Bash by Informa. Archived from the original on 31 December 2025.
- Sorrells, Mitra (7 August 2014). "How a Convention Surprised Fans With "Pop-Up Programming"". BizBash by Informa. Archived from the original on 22 April 2026.
- Stack, Liam (26 May 2020) [19 December 2019]. "J.K. Rowling Criticized After Tweeting Support for Anti-Transgender Researcher". The New York Times. Archived from the original on 21 August 2025.
- Stein, Louisa Ellen (2015). Millenial Fandom: Television Audiences in the Transmedia Age. Iowa City: University of Iowa Press. doi:10.2307/j.ctt20p587m. ISBN 9781609383558. JSTOR j.ctt20p587m. LCCN 2015005561.
- Steinberg, Neely (27 May 2009). "Can't escape Snape at LeakyCon". The Boston Phoenix. Vol. 38, no. 22. p. 6.
- Terrones, Terry (11 December 2019). "Harry Potter fan fest coming to Colorado". Denver Gazette. Archived from the original on 2 May 2026.
- Thomas, Paul A. (2018). I Wanna Wrock! The World of Harry Potter-Inspired "Wizard Rock" and Its Fandom. Jefferson, NC: McFarland & Company. ISBN 9781476673035. LCCN 2018046322.
- Vary, Adam B.; Lang, Brent (10 June 2020). "What J.K. Rowling's Anti-Trans Views Could Mean for 'Fantastic Beasts' Franchise — and 'Harry Potter' Fans". Variety. Archived from the original on 10 June 2020.
- Vondersmith, Jason (5 August 2019). "Bits & Pieces". Portland Tribune. Archived from the original on 2 May 2026.
- Vondersmith, Jason (25 August 2023). "Remember LeakyCon magical fan convention? It's back! (In 2024, that is)". YourOregonNews.com. Archived from the original on 21 April 2026.
- Vulliamy, Ed (12 August 2012). "National: No more films, no more books - but Potter cult thrives in US heartlands: Thousands of devotees of the Hogwarts universe flocked to a Chicago fan convention, where Ed Vulliamy found witches, wizards, dyed hair and heartwarming inspiration". The Observer. p. 18. Gale A299373757.
- Walsh, Kayla (30 August 2017). "This magical Harry Potter convention is on its way to Dublin". Dublinlive.ie. Archived from the original on 1 September 2017.
- Whitbrook, James; Jackson, Gordon (23 October 2019). "Updates From The Batman, Wonder Woman 1984 And More". Gizmodo AU. Archived from the original on 24 October 2019.
- Wilson, Amanda; Wilson, Kevin (20 August 2019). "Episode of Requirement: LeakyCon!". The Fox and the Foxhound (Podcast).
- Wilson, Amanda; Wilson, Kevin (9 August 2022). "The Wilsons Go To LeakyCon 2022!". The Fox and the Foxhound (Podcast).
- Wynne, Sharon Kennedy (6 May 2014). "LeakyCon will bring author John Green, Harry Potter fans to Orlando this summer". Tampa Bay Times. Archived from the original on 10 May 2014.
- Yehl, Joshua (19 March 2022) [1 February 2021]. "How Harry Potter Fans Are Coping With J.K. Rowling". IGN. Archived from the original on 25 April 2025.
