= Funworld Magazine =

Trade journal for the global attractions industry

- Senior Editor: Jeremy Schoolfield
- Categories: Trade Magazine
- Frequency: Monthly
- Total circulation: 34,000
- Founded: 1985
- Company: IAAPA
- Country: United States
- Based in: Orlando, Florida
- Language: English
- Website: www.iaapa.org/news/funworld

Funworld Magazine, stylized as FUNWORLD Magazine, is a trade journal for the global attractions industry. The magazine was launched in 1985. It is published monthly in both print and digital version by the International Association of Amusement Parks and Attractions (IAAPA). IAAPA also produces "News Flash", a daily e-newsletter that provides industry news stories from around the world.

== See also ==
- Amusement Today
- Attractions Magazine
