= ArtInsights =

Coordinates: 38.959111°N 77.357495°W

ArtInsights Animation and Film Art Gallery is an Art Gallery specializing in animation and film art.

Previously located in the Reston Town Center in Reston, Virginia, the gallery migrated to an online-only business model in October, 2023.

The gallery represents original production artwork (such as animation cels) and limited edition pieces, as well as film and illustrative art (e.g. giclées ). Themed exhibits were arranged regularly in the physical gallery space, and continue online through newsletters.

The physical gallery was host to many film and animation related exhibitions and their website continues to exclusively host official production and concept artwork from specific artists in the industry. In addition to in-gallery activities, Artinsights consistently contributes to efforts and projects related to the conservation and promotion of film artwork.

== Establishment ==
ArtInsights was founded by co-owners Leslie Combemale and Michael Barry in December 1994. The gallery featured primarily vintage and new limited editions and original animation cels from animation studios such as Walt Disney, Warner Brothers and Hanna-Barbera, as well as art from Peanuts, and other smaller animation studios.

== History ==
In 2005, the gallery began featuring art from the Harry Potter book series by Fred Bode and Mary Grandpre, as well as interpretive Disney art by a variety of artists including Jim Salvati, John Rowe, Tim Rogerson and Toby Bluth. At this time, ArtInsights also began retail representation of cinema artist John Alvin.

Later, the gallery expanded their film art inventory with properties including Indiana Jones, The Wizard of Oz, The Lord of the Rings, James Bond, and Star Wars original art.

The gallery has direct partnerships with a collection of film and illustrative artists and continues to represent the estate of the late John Alvin exclusively.

== Closure of Physical Gallery ==
Prompted by changes at Reston Town Centre, combined with the impact of COVID-19, the gallery found greater success by focusing on building relationships with their clients through phone and email, and chose to move their business activities exclusively online. The physical gallery closed on 15 October 2023.

== Exhibitions ==
ArtInsights held exhibitions regularly since opening in 1995. Some notable exhibitions include:

- "The Art of Sleeping Beauty: original cels and drawings". The opening was attended by Mary Costa, the voice of Aurora.
- "Classic cels of Courvoisier Galleries" with original art originally released through the gallery in San Francisco between 1937 and 1945.
- "The Art of Pink Floyd The Wall" including cels, backgrounds, and drawings used in the film.
- "Heroes of the Negro Leagues" featuring original art created for the book by Mark Chiarello.The entire collection of art shown was used in the making of the baseball cards and the book "Heroes of the Negro Leagues".
- "John Alvin: Leaving a Legacy of art for film" with original drawings and paintings spanning his career of movie campaign art.
- "Hollywood is Dead" featuring re-imagined movie posters by illustrator Matt Busch.
- "Marvel vs DC: The Art of the Superhero" featuring original and limited edition artwork from a variety of artists including Alex Ross, Jim Lee, Gabriele Dell'Otto and Simone Bianchi.

In August and September 2010, they had both "The Official Art of Harry Potter" including original drawings and paintings by Tommy Lee Edwards used for the style guide for Harry Potter and the Sorcerer's Stone and "A Galaxy of Star Wars Art" including original art never before available for public purchase by top selling Star Wars artist Christian Waggoner and production painter for Star Wars: Episode III, William Silvers as well as official Star Wars Celebration V artist Randy Martinez.

== Activities ==
ArtInsights promotes education regarding the collecting and caring of the types of artwork they carry. To this end, ArtInsights has created an educational series called "ArtInsights Collector's Education Series" (ACES).

ArtInsights further promotes their gallery and the concepts they promote through their web magazine. Articles include web and video interviews of artists and personalities important to the film art culture, movie reviews, and event video highlights. ArtInsights web interviews include Lella Smith from Disney's Archives and Animation Research Library, Disney artists Ruben Aquino and Mark Henn, and cinema artist Steve Chorney, among others.

Owner Leslie Combemale has a nationally syndicated (USA) movie review platform, in which she uses the pseudonym "Cinema Siren". Cinema Siren reviews are widely distributed through the Patch Network and exclusive videos interviews and additional commentary are made available through YouTube.

Combemale presented at San Diego Comic-Con in 2010 as an exclusive Harry Potter artwork retailer. She has also given presentations on the official art of Star Wars at the American Film Institute on the art of cinema artist John Alvin. In addition, she regularly speaks to school groups about the history and process of animation as well as developing her ACES videos.

ArtInsights contributed to activities in the local community of Reston when the gallery was located there, including:

- The Reston Town Center Christmas Parade.
- Kids Need to Read through sales from an exhibition of Harry Potter artwork.
- National Film Preservation Foundation through sales from the "Hollywood is Dead" exhibition by Matt Busch.
