= Peter Earnest =

American intelligence officer (1934–2022)

Personal details
- Born: January 1, 1934 Edinburgh, UK
- Died: February 13, 2022 (aged 88) Arlington, Virginia, U.S.
- Spouse: Karen Rice
- Children: 4
- Education: Georgetown University (BA)
- Occupation: Intelligence officer
- Awards: Intelligence Medal of Merit; Career Intelligence Medal

Peter Earnest (January 1, 1934 – February 13, 2022) was an American intelligence officer. He was the first executive director of the International Spy Museum.

== Early life and education ==
Edwin Peter Earnest was born on January 1, 1934 to Emily (Keating) Earnest and Edwin Burchett Earnest in Edinburgh, Scotland. At the time of his birth, his father was posted as Foreign Service officer to the U.S. consulate in Edinburgh. He was an only child and lived in Bethesda, Maryland. His father died when he was 12. He attended Georgetown Prep and then in 1955 graduated from Georgetown University with a Bachelor degree in history and political science.

== Career ==
In 1955, Earnest joined the Marine Corps, and was sent on a tour to Japan.

After returning to the US in 1957 he joined the Central Intelligence Agency (CIA). He worked at the CIA for 36 years, largely in Europe and the Middle East. He was stationed in Cyprus and Athens, Greece. In the late 1970s, he helped safeguard Arkady Shevchenko, a United Nations official who became the highest-ranking Soviet official to defect to the United States. He later worked in the Inspector General’s office and as the CIA’s Senate liaison. He concluded his CIA career as the agency’s chief spokesperson, and retired from the CIA in 1994.

In 2002, he became the founding Executive Director of the International Spy Museum originally located on F Street NW in Washington, DC. He retired in 2017 and continued to serve on the Board of Directors.

== Personal life ==
Earnest was married twice. He married Janet Chesney in 1957 and had four daughters: Nancy, Sheila, Patricia, and Carol. After his divorce in 1982, he married Karen Rice in 1988.

== Books ==
- with Suzanne Harper, The Real Spy's Guide To becoming a Spy (Harry N. Abrams, Inc., 2009) ISBN 978-0810983298 LCCN 2009-518
- with Maryann Karinch, Business Confidential: Lessons for Corporate Success From Inside the C.I.A. (AMACOM, 2010) ISBN 9780814414484 LCCN 2010-25030
- with Lynn M. Boughey, Harry Potter and the Art of Spying (Wise Ink Creative Publishing, 2014) ISBN 9781940014173 LCCN 2014-936945
