= Alanna Bennett =

Alanna Bennett is an American writer and producer. Her debut novel The Education of Kia Greer was released in May 2025 (Knopf). She has written for the television series Roswell, New Mexico, XO, Kitty, and The Second Best Hospital in the Galaxy.

== Life and career ==
Bennett began her career as a journalist and critic focused on entertainment and pop culture. She has written for Buzzfeed News, New York Magazine, New York Times, Teen Vogue, and others.

Her first screenwriting job was for the CW series Roswell, New Mexico. She was next an executive producer for season two of Netflix series XO, Kitty. She is also co-producer for season two of the Amazon Prime series The Second Best Hospital in the Galaxy. She signed with CAA in 2024.

Her debut novel The Education of Kia Greer, a young adult romance, was released in May 2025 under Knopf. The book was recommended by Paste, Entertainment Weekly, and Kirkus Reviews. As of February 2026 an adaptation for television is in development at Fox with Gabrielle Union and Dwyane Wade's production company.

Bennett is queer.
