= Rose City Book Pub =

Bookstore and restaurant in Portland, Oregon, U.S.

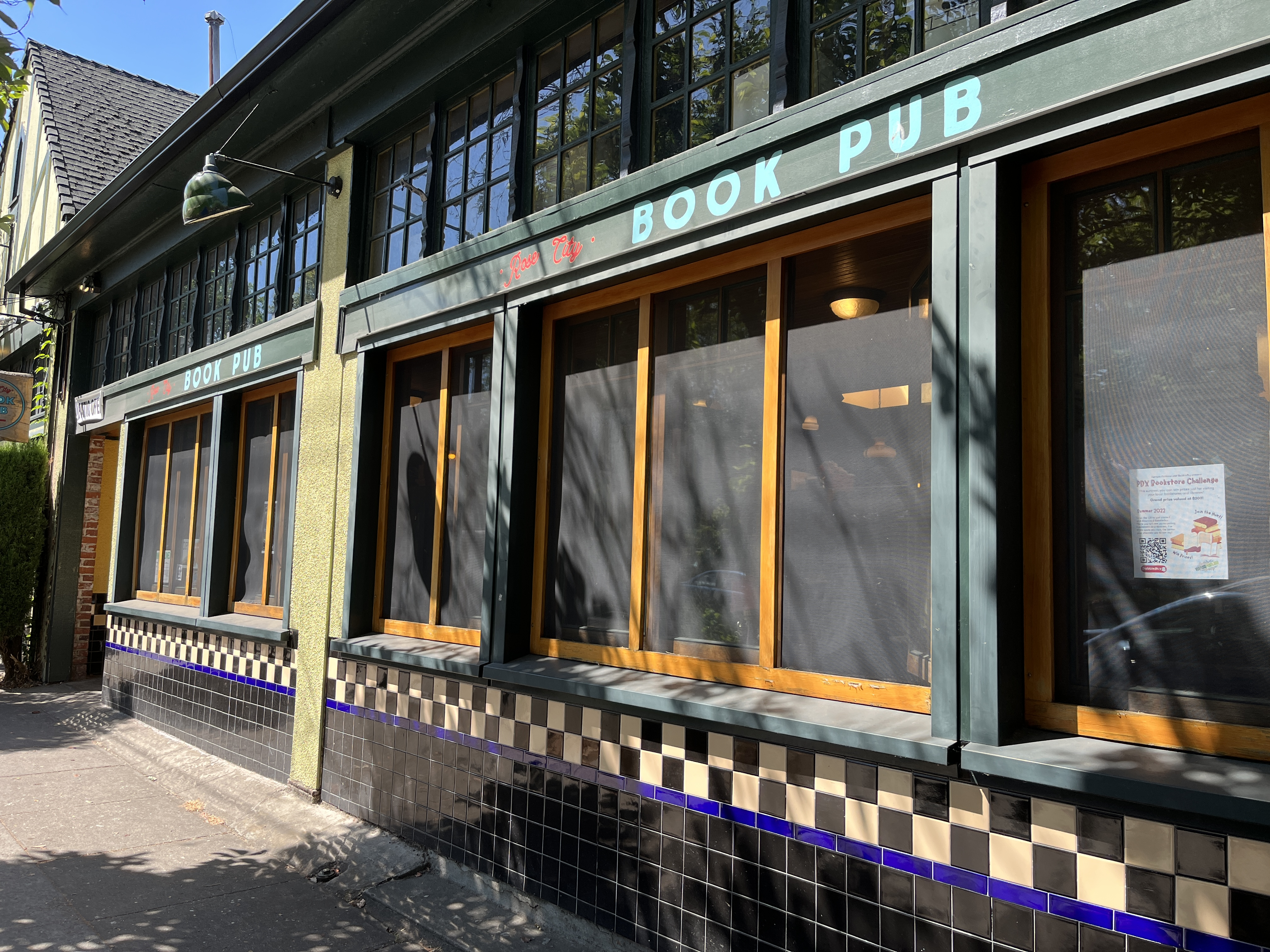
- The shop's exterior, 2022
- Interactive map of Rose City Book Pub

Restaurant information
- Established: 2018
- Owner: Elise Schumock
- Location: 1329 Northeast Fremont Street, Portland, Multnomah, Oregon, 97212, United States
- Coordinates: 45.5483°N 122.6521°W
- Website: rosecitybookpub.com

Rose City Book Pub is a bookstore and bar in Portland, Oregon, United States. Owner Elise Schumock started the business in 2018. It was described as the only business of its kind in the city in 2022.

== Description ==
Rose City Book Pub is a bookstore, bar, and cafe on Fremont Street in northeast Portland's Sabin neighborhood. The business hosts comedy and musical acts, open mics, poetry readings, trivia, writing workshops, and other activities regularly. Rose City Book Pub has indoor and outdoor seating. A sign above the bar reads, "You're allowed to exist!"

The menu includes soups and sandwiches, with gluten-free and vegan options, as well as spaghetti with meat sauce. Drink options include beer, cocktails, wine, coffee, tea, and sodas. Rose City Book Pub has served iftar during Ramadan. Offerings included chicken kebsah with tzatziki, hummus, pita, and tabbouleh, as well as a mezza platter as a vegetarian option.

== History ==
Owner Elise Schumock started the bookstore and bar Rose City Book Pub in 2018, with 7,000–8,000 used books available for sale. She opened the business in a space that previously housed County Cork. Some funds were raised via Indiegogo.

During the COVID-19 pandemic, Schumock applied for but did not receive Restaurant Revitalization Fund support from the Small Business Administration. An auction held in 2024 to help the business financially raised approximately $28,000.

== Reception ==
Elise Herron of Willamette Week wrote, "Rose City Book Pub has all the makings of a Portland cliché—craft brews, staged poetry readings, rows of old and obscure books and bargoers chatting in hushed tones about their favorite James Joyce and Virginia Woolf novels. But don't be deterred by appearances. The simple bar manages to fuse two of the city's trademarks—beer and used books—without a drip of pretension." Rose City Book Pub was a runner-up in the Best Family-Friendly Restaurant category of the newspaper's annual 'Best of Portland' readers' poll in 2024.

April Choi included Rose City Book Pub in Eater Portland's 2022 overview of eight eateries in Portland for "book lovers". The website's Levi Rogers also included the business in a 2023 overview of the "fundamentals" of Fremont Street.

== See also ==
- List of independent bookstores in the United States
- Used bookstore
