= Jim Salvati =

American painter (born 1957)

Jim Salvati (born 1957) is an American painter of contemporary figurative fine art. Salvati works in the film industry as a visual concept designer and cinematic artist. He is also in a select group of painters for Disney Fine Art. His clients include Disney, Warner Bros., Sony Pictures, 20th Century Studios, Radio City Music Hall, Arena Stage, the Ahmanson Theatre, and Verve Records. He won the Washington Post award of excellence for his work with the Kennedy Center Honorees. Salvati is also responsible for many of the finished paintings in the "Harry Potter" film series. He has also illustrated books such as The War of the Worlds, The Art of War and Frankenstein. He teaches at the Art Center College of Design in Pasadena, California.

== Biography ==
Jim Salvati was born in 1957 and has spent his whole life in Southern California. He comes from an artistic family—his mother painted, and his father filled the house with works by his favorite artists, of which there were many. Salvati says: "I [also] had two uncles that were artists, one a fine artist and the other an architect, and I always remember seeing their art and photography and was amazed at the beauty of what they had created."

Due to his uncles' influence, Salvati pursued a career in architecture once out of high school. However, he soon learned that the field wasn't for him:

"I learned that architecture was not as glamorous as I though it would be. An instructor noticed my frustration and saw that I could draw. He recommended that I take some drawing classes."

Shortly after this, he was accepted to the Art Center College of Design in Pasadena, California. Once out of school, he began painting for various industries: feature film, the surfing industry and print advertising.

== Style ==
Salvati chooses painting in oil:

"My paintings are extremely thick and layered. I love how experimental oil allows me to be. I can keep the colors moving until I like what they have done to the piece."

He describes his portraits as "painterly realism" in his 2007 interview with Art World News:

"I like the connection between people and their culture. The different emotions, gestures, moods, environments, and style of people in my life and those that I cross paths with, all become part of my storytelling. Even with my Disney art, I think it's important to show who a person or character is and what is the most interesting part of their life--that which is bold and has guts...[Perhaps that is why] I choose the moodiest and edgiest figures to work on. Cult films like Alice in Wonderland are fun, Fantasia's hallucinating imagery, and any of the evil, dark queens and princesses help to create more than just a pretty picture."

== Filmography ==
Title	Year	Credit
Over the Moon	2003	Advisor
Arcade	1993	Visual Concept Designer
Shadow Warriors	1996	Production Designer
Dollman	1991	Visual Concept Designer

== Books illustrated by Jim Salvati ==
- Killion, Bette (1994), Steadfast Tin Soldier, The (Leap Frog), ISBN 978-0-7853-0818-8
- Wells, H.G. (2005), The War of the Worlds, The Dalmatian Press, ISBN 978-1-4037-1438-1
- Goldenburg, Dorthea (2007), The Treasury of Fairy Tales (First ed.), Publications International, ISBN 978-0-7853-7771-9
- Shelley, Mary (2007), Frankenstein, The Dalmatian Press, ISBN 978-1-4037-3914-8
- Brown, Alton (2010), Good Eats 2: The Middle Years, Stewart, Tabori and Chang, ISBN 978-1-58479-857-6

== Theater posters illustrated by Jim Salvati ==
- A Delicate Balance. Edward Albee Pulitzer Prize Winner
- The Quality of Life. Jane Anderson
- History Boys. Alan Bennet
- A Christmas Story
- Death of a Salesman
