= Attractions Magazine =

American amusement park magazine

- Managing editor: Blake Taylor
- Categories: Amusement parks
- Frequency: Quarterly
- Publisher: Matt Roseboom
- Founder: Ricky Brigante; Matt Roseboom
- First issue: November 2007; 18 years ago
- Country: United States
- Based in: Orlando, Florida
- Language: English
- Website: attractionsmagazine.com

Attractions Magazine, originally Orlando Attractions Magazine, was an American quarterly magazine that focused on theme parks and related tourist attractions. The publication ceased its regular print publication schedule in 2019 but still maintains social channels and a website which provides reporting on new rides, park openings, industry news and interviews with prominent figures in themed entertainment.

== History ==
Attractions Magazine was founded in 2007 as Orlando Attractions Magazine, with its first quarterly issue released later that year for theme park enthusiasts and industry observers. The founders, Ricky Brigante and Matt Roseboom, developed the publication to cover ride news, park developments and interviews with creators and executives in themed entertainment.

The publication grew alongside the expansion of digital content, maintaining an online presence and branching into video and audio formats in subsequent years. Ownership and editorial roles evolved over time, with Blake Taylor serving as managing editor as of 2026.

== Content and coverage ==
Attractions Magazine covers a range of topics relating to amusement parks, water parks, themed attractions and related entertainment venues. Coverage includes previews of new ride experiences, park announcements and industry events. It has featured interviews with designers, park officials and executives, as well as reviews of new attractions.

== Multimedia ==
=== YouTube channel ===
In addition to its print and web publications, Attractions Magazine operates a popular YouTube channel featuring news updates, ride walk‑throughs, first‑looks at new attractions and coverage of industry events. As of January 2026, the channel has approximately one million subscribers and hundreds of millions of views worldwide.

=== Podcast ===
Attractions Magazine also produces The Attractions Podcast, a regular audio show in which hosts and guests discuss planning, news, announcements and trends in the theme park and attractions industry. Episodes have featured discussions on new ride openings, industry developments and guest experiences at parks worldwide.

== See also ==
- Amusement Today
- Funworld Magazine
