= List of geek rock artists =

This is a list of artists who are known for producing music in the geek rock genre including its subgenres such as nerd punk and trock.

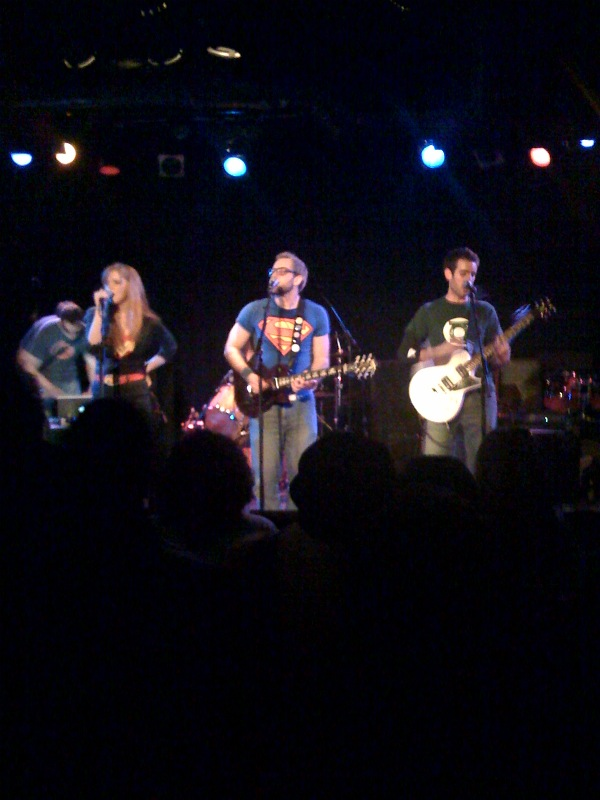
I Fight Dragons performing at Martyrs', Chicago, in 2009

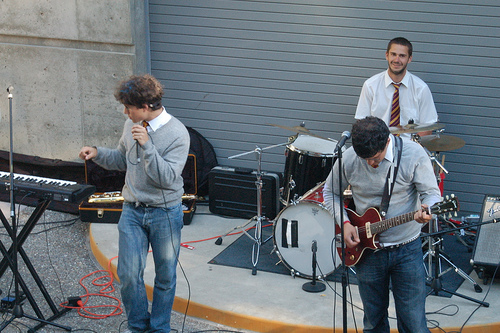
Harry and the Potters performing in June 2007

== 1960s and 1970s ==
- ± Frank Zappa (1955–1993)
- Captain Beefheart and the Magic Band (1964–1982)
- Descendents (1977–present)
- Devo (1973–present)
- ± Elvis Costello(1970–present)
- Oingo Boingo (1979–1995)
- Robyn Hitchcock (1972–2006)
- ± Talking Heads (1975–1991)
- Tori Amos (1979–present)
- "Weird Al" Yankovic (1976–present)
- XTC (1976–2006)

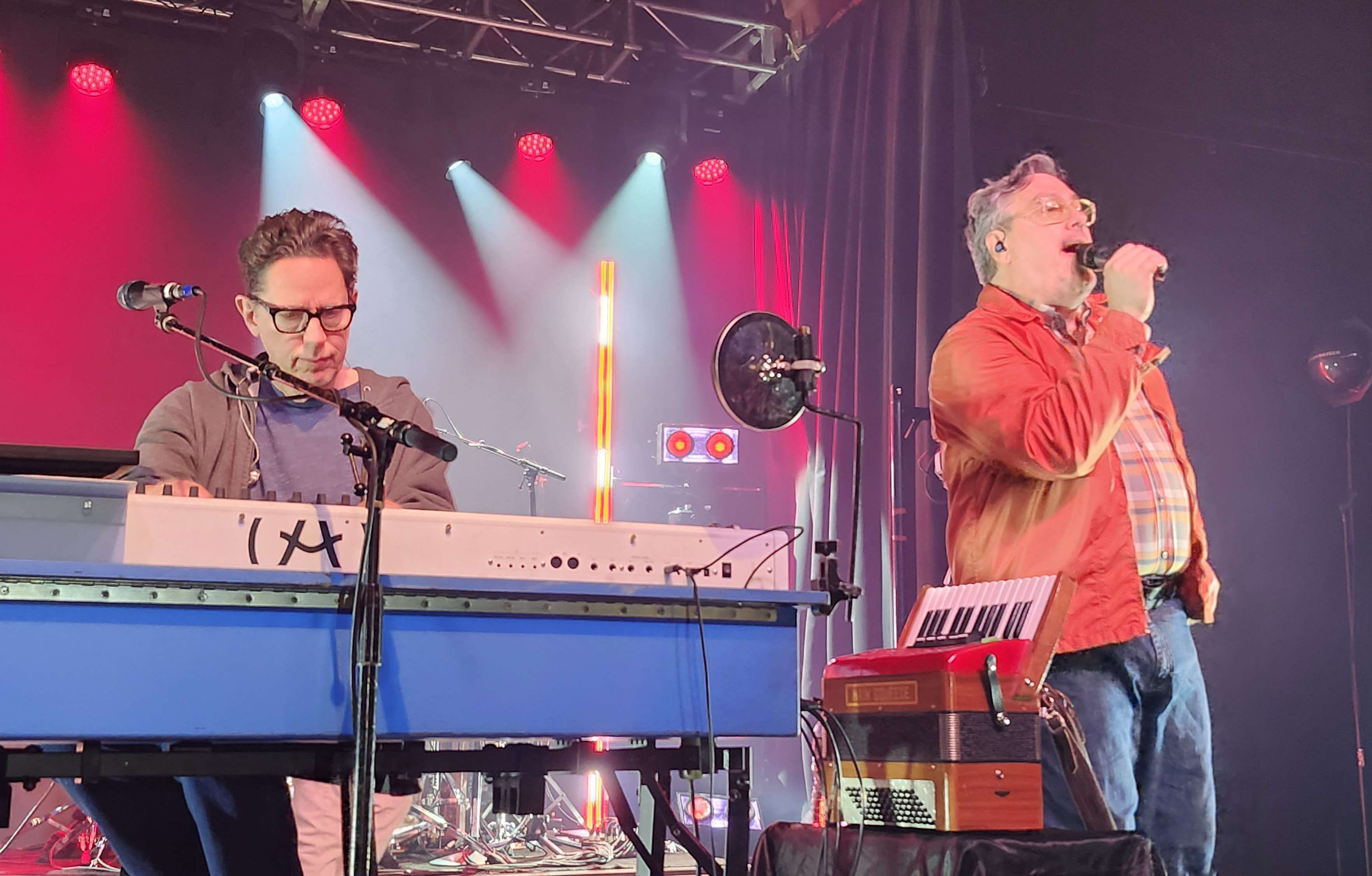
They Might Be Giants performing in late-2025

== 1980s ==
- Barenaked Ladies (1988–present)
- Crash Test Dummies (1988–present)
- The Dead Milkmen (1983–present)
- Thomas Dolby (1981–present)
- Gwar (1984–present)
- Moxy Früvous (1989–2001)
- They Might Be Giants (1982–present)
- Violent Femmes (1980–present)
- Ween (1984–present)

== 1990s ==
- Andrew W.K. (1998–present)
- The Aquabats (1994–present)
- Atom And His Package (1997–present)
- Belle and Sebastian (1996–present)
- Ben Folds Five (1993–present)
- Bloodhound Gang (1992–2015)
- Bowling for Soup (1994–present)
- Chixdiggit (1991–present)
- Cake (1991–present)
- Dynamite Hack (1997–present)
- Fountains of Wayne (1996–2013)
- Jill Sobule (1989–2025)
- Logan Whitehurst & the Jr. Science Club (1997–2006)
- Minibosses (1999–present)
- Motion City Soundtrack (1997–present)
- The Mountain Goats (1991–present)
- Nerf Herder (1994–present)
- Ozma (1995–present)
- The Presidents Of The United States Of America (1993–2015)
- Radioactive Chicken Heads (1993–present)
- Tenacious D (1994–present)
- Warp 11 (1999–2024)
- Weezer (1992–present)
- Wheatus (1995–present)

== 2000s ==
- alt-J (2007–present)
- Chameleon Circuit (2008–2014)
- Jonathan Coulton (2003–present)
- The Darkest of the Hillside Thickets (2003–present)
- The Franchise (2004–2008)
- Harry and the Potters (2002–present)
- hellogoodbye (2001–present)
- I Fight Dragons (2009–present)
- Joanna Wang (2008–present)
- Lemon Demon (2003–present)
- The Megas (2004–present)
- The Protomen (2003–present)
- Paul and Storm (2004–present)
- Thundering Asteroids! (2009–2019)

== 2010s ==
- The Doubleclicks (2011–present)
- Double Experience (2014–present)
- Five Year Mission (2010–present)
- Time Crash (2012–2021)

== Note ==
- ± Rock and Roll Hall of Fame inductee
