= Lasers and Feelings =

Studio album by The Doubleclicks
- Released: July 9, 2013
- Genre: Nerd-folk
- Length: 33:07
- Producer: Stephen Webber, Laser Malena-Webber & Aubrey Turner

The Doubleclicks chronology
Christmas Ain't About Me (2012)	Lasers and Feelings (2013)	Dimetrodon (2014)

Lasers and Feelings is the second album from the nerd-folk duo The Doubleclicks, released on July 9, 2013. The album debuted at #7 on Billboard's Comedy Albums chart for the week ending July 27, 2013.

== Songs ==
"Nothing to Prove", a response to the misogynistic "fake geek girl" concept within geek culture, is the most important of the tracks on the album.

"Lasers and Feelings", "The Mystery's Gone" and "Oh, Mr. Darcy" are about relationships. "Lasers and Feelings" is a love song to a supervillain with a "ska-style upbeat rhythm that underpins a clever lyrical turn" "The Mystery's Gone", a "jazzy rock number", is about a Twitter romance that came to a disappointing end when the couple meet in real life. "Oh, Mr. Darcy" is from the duo's earlier Chainmail and Cello album, covering mixed feelings about Colin Firth in the 1980 BBC adaptation of Pride and Prejudice and a bad relationship in Laser's past. "Can't You See The World Is Ending" shares the themes of procrastination with "Something Else" and bad relationships with "Oh, Mr. Darcy".

Aubrey sings on "Something Else" and "Christmas Ain't About Me." She is described as a "post-modern chanteuse" on the former, while the latter is an "easy-to-swallow tango form". (The latter is a reworking of the title song of the EP of the same name, with an entirely different tune.)

"The Guy Who Yelled Freebird" is a comedic song about "rock's oldest joke" of requesting Lynyrd Skynyrd's "Free Bird" regardless of performer or style. "Rock Star Life", a "intoxicating blend of Dixieland and country-rock", is similarly referencing life in a band; in this case the hardships of touring.

"Impostor" is a new version of a Song Fu entry from January 2012. The song is a "positively haunting" tribute to NASA's Curiosity Mars rover and the topic of self-esteem issues, which will "ruin your day. Or to speed up the invention of a method to send hugs through intrastellar radio wave transmissions."

== Reception ==
Nothing to Prove
A short sample of "Nothing to Prove", including part of a verse and the titular refrain.

Lasers and Feelings debuted at #7 on Billboard's Comedy Albums chart for the week ending July 27, 2013. When questioned about the category in an interview with Wired, Laser said "We don’t really write for a genre in mind, but I think Lasers and Feelings probably got classified as comedy because there are several songs on there that really are straight-up comedy ('The Guy Who Yelled Freebird,' for example)."

"Z" of GeekDad said that Lasers and Feelings "pushes the envelope regarding what geek music can and should be". Expanding on this, in light of the increasingly mainstream nature of geek culture, this album is "indicative of a shifting paradigm within the geek music meta-community that runs simultaneously complementary and counter to the integration of nerdier fare into the broader entertainment world." Being able to appeal to both "hardcore" and "casual" fans allows The Doubleclicks, and similar bands, the freedom to write songs that cover general personal issues, geeky subjects, and geek culture itself.

Along with the importance of "Nothing To Prove", "standout track" of the album, Erik Henriksen of The Portland Mercury highlights the songs "Can't You See The World Is Ending" and "The Mystery's Gone" some of The Doubleclicks' best work.

== Track listing ==
No.	Title	Length
1.	"Lasers and Feelings"	3:02
2.	"Can't You See The World Is Ending"	3:04
3.	"The Guy Who Yelled Freebird"	3:45
4.	"Something Else"	3:14
5.	"The Mystery's Gone"	2:33
6.	"Nothing to Prove"	3:53
7.	"Impostor"	4:24
8.	"Rock Star Life"	2:48
9.	"Christmas Ain't About Me"	2:47
10.	"Oh, Mr. Darcy"	3:18

== Credits ==
The lyrics and music for the album were written by Laser Malena-Webber and Aubrey Turner, with the exception of "Something Else" and "The Mystery's Gone". The former was written by Aubrey and the latter by Laser. Their father, Stephen Webber, contributed to the music of both. He also performed additional accompaniment for some songs on guitars, mandolin, piano, synth, banjo, percussion and bass. Their mother, Susan Webber, was on bass for "The Guy Who Yelled Freebird".

Additional performances were by provided by Jordan Rose on drums and Billy Novick on saxophone (alto, tenor and baritone and clarinet. Rodrigo Malvido provided on percussion "Christmas Ain't About Me". Nick Zielger was on bass clarinet for "Rock Star Life". Justin Schornstein was on bass for "Lasers and Feelings" and "Can't You See The World Is Ending".

Jonathan Wyner mastered the album. Engineering was done by Stephen Webber, Aubrey Turner and Ian Kagey. The album was edited by Stephen Webber, Aubrey Turner, Max Schad and Nick Ziegler. Mixing was done by Stephen Webber, Aubrey Turner and (on tracks 6–8) Ian Kagey.
