= Ministry of Magic (band) =

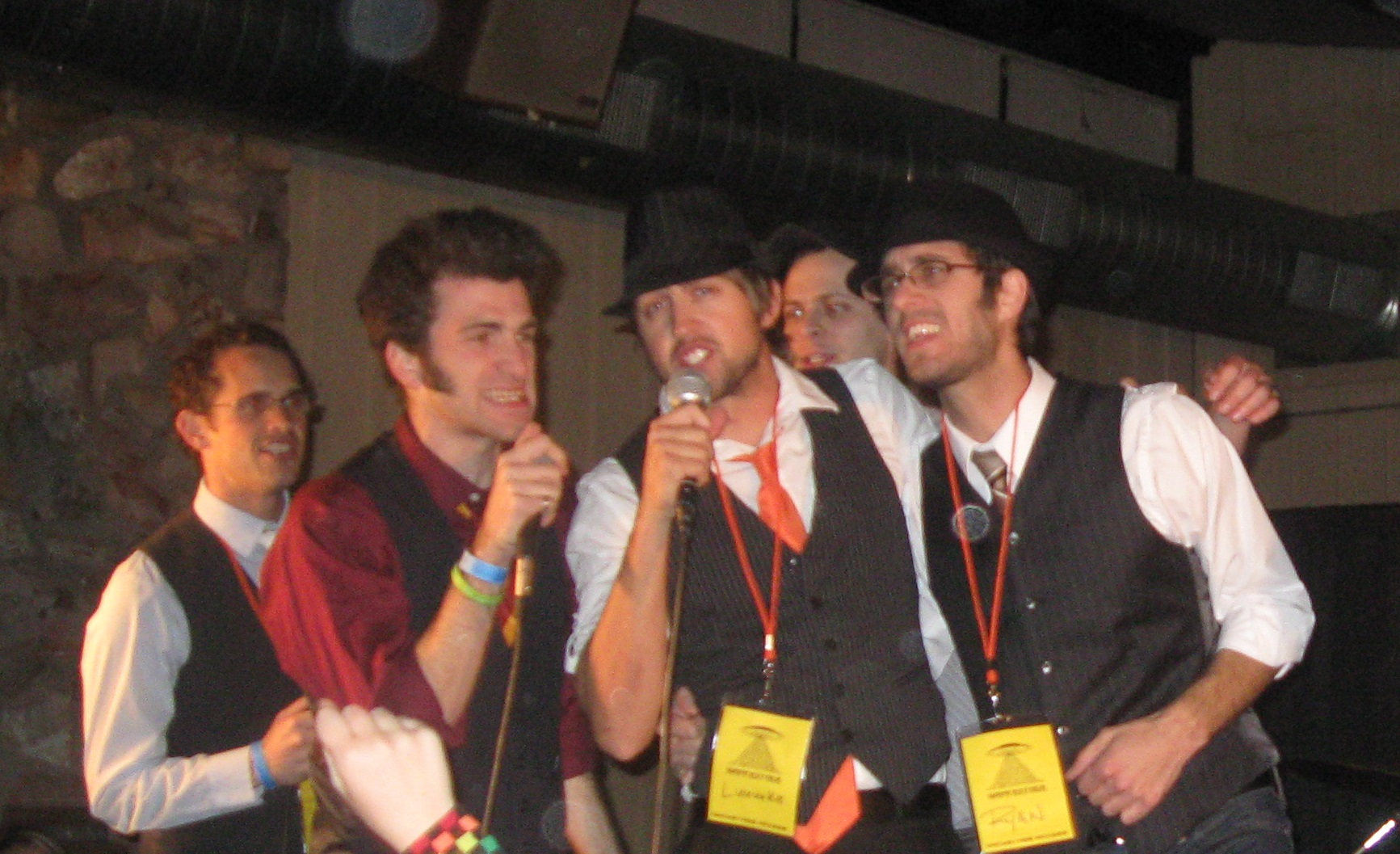
- MOM performing at Wrockstock IV. From left to right: Aaron Nordyke, Jason Munday, Luke Conard and Ryan Seiler.

Background information
- Genres: Wizard rock
- Years active: 2007–2012

Ministry of Magic was a wizard rock band with a pop/electronica sound. The band was started in 2007 by Jason Munday and several of his friends. They have released several albums and given hundreds of performances.

In a 2010 survey carried out by Kelli Rohlman, a musicology graduate student from Texas Tech University, 98% of 125 respondents listed Ministry of Magic among their favorite wizard rock bands.
