= Christmas Ain't About Me =

EP by The Doubleclicks
- Released: December 1, 2012
- Genre: Nerd-folk
- Producer: Laser Malena-Webber and Aubrey Turner

The Doubleclicks chronology
Worst Superpower Ever (2012)	Christmas Ain't About Me (2012)	Lasers and Feelings (2013)

Christmas Ain't About Me is a Christmas EP released by the nerd-folk duo The Doubleclicks on December 1, 2012.

== Track listing ==
No.	Title	Length
1.	"The Greatest Gift of All (The Hobbit)"	1:30
2.	"Christmas Ain't About Me"	1:51
3.	"Wherever You Are"	1:49
4.	"Happy Holidays, Too"	2:42
5.	"The End Of The World"	2:33
