= Worst Superpower Ever =

EP by The Doubleclicks
- Released: April 30, 2012
- Recorded: Portland, Oregon
- Genre: Nerd-folk
- Producer: Laser Malena-Webber and Aubrey Turner

The Doubleclicks chronology
Chainmail and Cello (2012)	Worst Superpower Ever (2012)	Christmas Ain't About Me (2012)

Worst Superpower Ever is an EP for children released by the nerd-folk duo The Doubleclicks on April 30, 2012.

== Track listing ==
No.	Title	Length
1.	"Uncle Geek's House"	1:57
2.	"Worst Superpower Ever" (child-friendly version)	2:24
3.	"The Nerdy Birthday Song" (child-friendly version)	1:00
4.	"No Easy Way"	2:34
5.	"This Fantasy World" (child-friendly version)	2:59
6.	"Clever Girl"	1:10
7.	"Apostrophe" (child-friendly version)	2:12
8.	"A Lullaby For Mr. Bear"	2:07
