= Dimetrodon (album) =

Studio album by The Doubleclicks
- Released: June 10, 2014
- Recorded: Live tracks only: Norwescon, Seattle, Washington
- Genre: Nerd-folk
- Length: 38:24
- Producer: Mike Phirman, Laser Malena-Webber and Aubrey Turner

The Doubleclicks chronology
Lasers and Feelings (2013)	Dimetrodon (2014)	President Snakes (2015)

Dimetrodon is the third album from the nerd-folk duo The Doubleclicks, released on June 10, 2014. The album was funded via Kickstarter with a goal of $18,000. The campaign exceeded this and raised $80,923, on February 18, 2014, making it the most successful Portland music Kickstarter to date.

== Production ==
The Doubleclicks sought funding for the album via the crowd-funding site Kickstarter, asking for $18,000. The Kickstarter campaign ended with $80,923 from 1,923 backers; 449% of the sum requested. This was the most successful Portland music Kickstarter campaign to date and also "legitimized [them] as a true representative of nerds everywhere."

== Track listing ==
No.	Title	Length
1.	"Cats and Netflix"	2:39
2.	"Unstoppable Force"	3:13
3.	"Dimetrodon"	3:23
4.	"Ennui (On We Go)"	3:16
5.	"Where Did You Go?"	2:48
6.	"Wonder"	3:35
7.	"Internet Troll"	3:15
8.	"Working For Me"	3:01
9.	"Tabletop" (featuring Adam WarRock)	3:55
10.	"Godzilla"	3:05
11.	"Love You Like A Burrito"	2:34
12.	"Will They Or Won't They" (live in Seattle)	2:23
13.	"Clever Girl" (live in Seattle)	1:11

Dimetrodon
Sample of "Dimetrodon" by The Doubleclicks.
