= Don't You Love Me =

Don't You Love Me may refer to:

- "Don't You Love Me" (49ers song), 1990
- "Don't You Love Me" (Eternal song), 1997
- "Don't You Love Me?", a song by The Doubleclicks from the 2012 album Chainmail and Cello
- "Don't You Love Me", a song from the 2003 Indian film Chura Liyaa Hai Tumne
