= Lucia Fasano =

- Born: February 1, 1993 (age 33)
- Origin: Los Angeles, California, United States
- Genres: Folk, Indie, Singer-Songwriter, Comedy
- Occupations: Singer-songwriter, comedian, musician, writer, actress, YouTuber
- Instruments: Mandolin, ukulele
- Years active: 1999–present
- Website: luciafasano.com

Lucia Fasano (born February 1, 1993) is an American singer-songwriter, comedian, actress, comic book writer, cartoonist, and writer based in Los Angeles, California. Fasano co-created and co-stars (with The Doubleclicks's Angela Webber) in the web series Catty B's.

== Early life and education ==
Fasano was born in Los Angeles, California, to filmmaker John Fasano and screenwriter Cynthia Cirile. She attended college at Portland State University in Portland, Oregon.

== Career ==
=== Music ===
Fasano's music career began with her Los Angeles-based indie rock band Shady Characters, who self-released EP in 2010 and Sunny Days in 2012. Fasano's first solo album was recorded in Portland, Oregon and produced by Larry Crane. Nerd-folk music duo The Doubleclicks created their own independent record label Doubleclicks Records and their first album was Fasano's debut, Radio Silence. The Kickstarter crowdfunding campaign for the album was funded 228 percent with the original goal set by the Webbers at $3,000. However, $6,858 was received. Her music has been described as "P.J. Harvey meets Neutral Milk Hotel." Her follow-up record, produced by Hutch Harris and Jessica Boudreaux, Best Friend Forever, was released in 2019.

==== Snakes On The Radio ====
On August 16, 2016, it was announced that both The Doubleclicks and Lucia Fasano would begin their tour Snakes On The Radio in the cities Santa Clara, California, Oakland, California, Burbank, California, West Hollywood, California, and Portland, Oregon. The Doubleclicks said they would play both their old songs and newer songs from their latest album President Snakes. Lucia Fasano would play songs from their debut album Radio Silence. The last show is a CD release party at the new Portland, Oregon comic book store Books With Pictures for Fasano's album Radio Silence which will also feature Barbara Holm and Kyle McCormick.

=== Comedy ===
On November 7, 2015, Fasano performed at the monthly comedy showcase Quirktastic alongside Bri Pruett. On December 2, 2015, she performed at another monthly comedy showcase Comedy In Space! with Jeremy Eli, Dan Weber, Barbara Holm, and Bri Pruett. On August 24, 2016, she joined the hosts Barbara Gray, Brandie Posey and Tess Barker of Maximum Fun podcast Lady to Lady for the episode "Just One Groove".

==== Twitter ====
Fasano's online social networking service Twitter account was named the "funniest twitter" by American indie rock band The Thermals. On December 22, 2015, one of Fasano's tweets on Twitter was listed among "The Funniest Star Wars: The Force Awakens Tweets" covering the U.S. theater release of Star Wars: The Force Awakens. On March 6, 2016, Mashable's Sandra Gonzales ranked one of her tweets fifth on her favorite tweets covering the Downton Abbey series finale. On June 15, 2016, Pajiba's Vivian Kane listed one of her tweets among the "pun possibilities" on the initial news of English actor Tom Hiddleston and American singer-songwriter Taylor Swift.

=== Comics ===
In addition to regularly publishing cartoons on online magazine The Higgs Weldon, Fasano's comics writing will be featured in an upcoming anthology from Image Comics entitled Where We Live, with art from former Rat Queens artist Tess Fowler.

== Reception ==
Alternative weekly The Portland Mercury's Alison Hallett cited Fasano's advice in her beginner's guide on stand-up comedy at an open mic. Alternative weekly The Portland Mercury's Barbara Holm cited her as an example of a feminist comedian who "[o]n a local level [...] use humor to empower women through art." The Mary Sue's Teresa Jusino praised her YouTube video on Mad Max: Fury Road character Imperator Furiosa. Alternative weekly Willamette Week's Matthew Singer listed Lucia Fasano on the ballot for Portland's "Best New Band" in 2014—2016.

== Discography ==
- Radio Silence (2016)
- Best Friend Forever (2019)

== Filmography ==
Year	Title	Role	Notes
1999	The Auteur Theory	Grim Reaper - The Crap Shoot of Life	
2006	The Legend of Butch & Sundance	Cantina Girl	
2015-Present	Catty B's	Host	16 episodes
2016	Portlandia	LASIK Girl	
2019	The Deuce	Monica	
2019	Single Parents	Employee	
2019	Dollface	Nerdy Girl	
