= The Franchise (disambiguation) =

The Franchise is another name for suffrage.

The Franchise may also refer to:

- The Franchise (band), a rock band from Washington D.C.
- The Franchise (novel), a 1983 novel by Peter Gent
- The Franchise (2011 TV series), a television show on Showtime
- The Franchise (2024 TV series), a comedy television series on HBO
- WFNZ (AM), branded as "The Franchise" from 2003–2009

== People nicknamed "The Franchise" ==
- Tom Seaver (1944–2020), Major League Baseball Hall of Fame pitcher
- Sting (wrestler) (born 1959), professional wrestler
- Shane Douglas (born 1964), professional wrestler
- David Reutimann (born 1970), NASCAR driver
- Steve Francis (born 1977), NBA player
- Francisco Liriano (born 1983), Major League Baseball pitcher
- Tim Lincecum (born 1984), Major League Baseball pitcher
- Tyrese Maxey (born 2000), NBA player

== See also ==
- Franchise
