= President Snakes =

Studio album by The Doubleclicks
- Released: August 11, 2015
- Genre: Nerd-folk
- Producer: Laser Malena-Webber & Aubrey Turner

The Doubleclicks chronology
| Dimetrodon (2014) | President Snakes (2015) | Love Problems (2017) |

President Snakes is the fourth album from the nerd-folk duo The Doubleclicks, released on August 11, 2015. The album was funded via Kickstarter with a goal of $30,000. The goal was achieved within the first few days of the campaign's launch. It exceeded this and raised $55,535, on June 2, 2015.

== Production ==
On May 7, 2015, The Doubleclicks sought funding for the album via the crowd-funding site Kickstarter, asking for $30,000. On June 2, 2015, the Kickstarter campaign ended with $55,535 from 1,282 backers. Kickstarter rewards include a coloring book and a tabletop role-playing game called Fiasco. In an interview with OregonLive.com's David Greenwald, Laser Malena-Webber says "[i]t's the most honest and personal stuff we've put out, it's not all funny and it's not all nerdy."

== Track listing ==
| No. | Title | Length |
|---|---|---|
| 1. | "Tiny Paper Elephant" | 3:12 |
| 2. | "Cats At Parties" | 2:48 |
| 3. | "Really Big Chickens" | 2:12 |
| 4. | "President Snakes (Part 1)" | 1:09 |
| 5. | "The Middle" | 2:50 |
| 6. | "This Is My Jam" | 1:55 |
| 7. | "Happy Holidays, Too" | 2:22 |
| 8. | "Bad Memories" | 3:46 |
| 9. | "President Snakes (Part 2)" | 1:07 |
| 10. | "Now I Am The Fastest" | 2:28 |
| 11. | "Why Can't Every City Be Portland" | 2:30 |
| 12. | "Coming Home To You" | 1:40 |
| 13. | "Thank God It's Over" | 2:00 |

== Tour ==
On October 17, 2015, The Doubleclicks performed at Zappcon in Fresno, California. On August 16, 2016, it was announced that both The Doubleclicks and Lucia Fasano would begin their tour Snakes On The Radio in the cities Santa Clara, California, Oakland, California, Burbank, California, West Hollywood, California, and Portland, Oregon. The Doubleclicks said they would play both their old songs and newer songs from their latest album President Snakes. Lucia Fasano would play songs from their debut album Radio Silence.

== Reception ==
In anticipation of the new album, many publications wrote favorably of the band. GeekDad's Jonathan H. Liu stated "[t]he Doubleclicks are a GeekDad favorite." The Mary Sue's Teresa Jusino said "[w]e love the geek girl sounds of The Doubleclicks, and we know you do, too!" Portland Tribune's Pamplin Media Group has called their music "funny, sweet and insightful songs about dinosaurs, cats, Netflix, space and the Dungeons and Dragons game."

On September 12, 2015, President Snakes debuted at #4 on Billboard's Comedy Albums chart and moved to #2 the following week.
