= Thundering Asteroids! =

Nerd-punk band from Portland, Oregon

- Origin: Portland, Oregon, U.S.
- Genres: Nerd punk
- Years active: 2009–present
- Labels: Unsigned
- Members: Minn; Skolnick; Scott Starkiller; Trey K421
- Past members: CS-DU3; Dwight Solo; Ed Thousand-One; Mack 1138
- Website: thunderingasteroids.com

Thundering Asteroids! is an American four-person, female-fronted nerd punk band from Portland, Oregon. The band was formed in 2009, released an EP in 2011 and studio albums in 2012 and 2014. Their genre of music is often inspired by geek pop culture, the band is named after a Robotech exclamation and each member uses a stage name based on the Star Wars expanded universe.

== History ==
I've Got a Thing for the Goblin King
A short sample of "I've Got a Thing for the Goblin King" from the band's first album Tomorrow's Yesterdays Today! (2012), including the titular refrain.

The band started with friends, and half of the initial band members, Scott Cushman and Dwight Reid joking that, with all the time consumed by their jobs and families, they should start a band so they could then only practice twice a year and never play live shows. In 2009, Cushman's wife dared them to actually perform, which led to the formation of the band and their first show.

The band have stated that "nothing is too nerdy or too geeky to inspire us in music." For example, the song "Frak Off" developed, from an attempt to string together as many science fiction swear words as possible, into a narrative about a nerdy girl dumping her boyfriend. Other songs directly reference specific media, such as the board game The Settlers of Catan ("Wood for Sheep"), the 1984 The Karate Kid film ("Cobra Kai Fight Song") and the Scott Pilgrim graphic novels ("Scott Pilgrim Vs. My Heart"). The source of songs within the band are also varied: "I've Got a Thing for the Goblin King", about David Bowie's character in the 1986 film Labyrinth, was suggested by frontwoman Jaime "Minn" McGeathy and "Monster Movie" started as just a guitar riff. Song creation is a collaborative effort for the band, although a lot of the writing is by Cushman. Beyond the music itself, the band members use Star Wars-based stage names and the name of band itself comes from an exclamation used by the character Captain Henry Gloval in Robotech. As of 2013, they say "probably the nerdiest thing we've done was play a show at The Hard Rock Café for the Microsoft Techready convention."

The band filmed their first music video, for "Kill Screen of My Heart", at Portland's Ground Kontrol arcade in May 2012; which opened early to allow them access. Their first album, Tomorrow's Yesterdays Today! was released in December of the same year. Their second album, The Nerd Punk Guide to the Galaxy, was released in October 2014.

The song "Sexy Lamp", based on comic book writer Kelly Sue DeConnick's Sexy Lamp Test for female characters, was highlighted by DeConnick herself on Tumblr in August 2014.

In 2014, McGeathy was part of the "Women in Nerd Music" panel at GeekGirlCon with Angela and Aubrey Webber of The Doubleclicks, Molly Lewis, Sammus and Shubzilla.

== Band members ==
All the members' stage names are based on Star Wars and its expanded universe.

=== Current members ===
- Minn – Jaime McGeathy (lead vocals)
- Skolnick (guitar)
- Scott Starkiller – Scott Cushman (bass guitar)
- Trey K421 – Trey Miles (drums)

=== Former members ===
- Dwight Solo – Dwight Reid (guitar)
- Ed Thousand-One – Ed Cole (guitar)
- CS-DU3 — Colin Sears (drums)
- Mack 1138 – Brendan Mack Hagin (drums)

== Discography ==
=== Thundering Asteroids! ===
EP released in 2011. The Punk News review states "Overall, this is a pretty solid EP. The band straddles new wave and punk rock with a hint of rock 'n' roll thrown in for good measure."

No.	Title	Length
1.	"We Need Another Cold War"	3:52
2.	"They Live"	1:38
3.	"Glued Up Over You"	0:56
4.	"Kill Screen of my Heart"	2:05
5.	"SK8 & Destroy"	1:57

=== Tomorrow's Yesterdays Today! ===
First studio album; released December 2012. The Punk News review lists "Scott Pilgrim Vs My Heart" as the strongest song on the album, stating that the band "unleash some strong riffs and clever lyrics, once again delivered in an almost disinterested, but perfect, way by the excellent Minn." Also highlighted is "I've Got a Thing for the Goblin King" as "an extremely catchy tune with a basic but memorable refrain." Overall the album is described as "quite riff laden, with the guitar driving the songs along assisted by some energetic bass lines and a keen, snapping drum sound, all of which helps makes this the amusing and enjoyable musical romp it is."

No.	Title	Length
1.	"All I Got Was This Lousy Future"	3:00
2.	"Scott Pilgrim Vs My Heart"	2:04
3.	"I've Got a Thing for the Goblin King"	2:51
4.	"Frak Off"	2:28
5.	"Cobra Kai Fight Song"	1:51
6.	"He Never Played Atari"	1:53
7.	"Swallow Your Soul"	2:45

=== The Nerd Punk Guide to the Galaxy ===
Second studio album; released October 2014.

No.	Title	Length
1.	"Nuke This Site From Orbit"	2:08
2.	"Sexy Lamp"	2:54
3.	"Hyperspace Pub Crawl"	2:32
4.	"I Don't Want to Be a Superhero"	2:58
5.	"Hit It & Crit"	2:14
6.	"Circle Pit Robot"	2:00
7.	"Voight-Kampff Test"	1:56
8.	"Monster Movie"	1:56
9.	"Punk Rock Mix Tape"	2:40
