= Velvet Darkness (band) =

Mexican heavy metal band

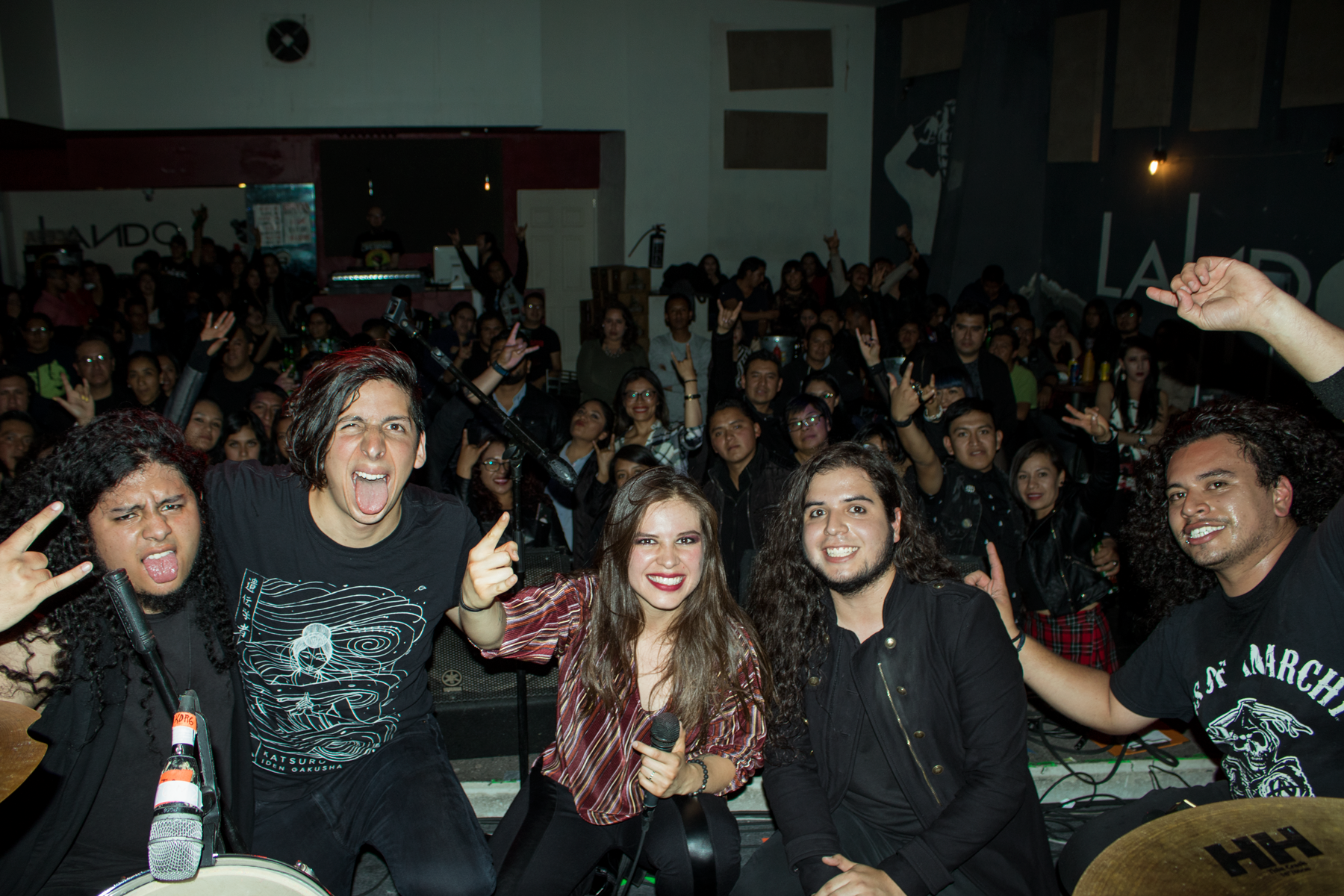
- From left to right: Altair, Charles Kray, Kate Michaels, Joe SaraF, and Teko Yanez in 2019

Background information
- Origin: Ciudad Satélite, Mexico
- Genres: Heavy metal, power metal
- Years active: 2013–present
- Members: Charles Kray; John Rai; Kate Michaels; Altair; Alfredo Murasaki; Emilio Aparicio
- Past members: Joe SaraF; Rob “Teko” Yanez; Lucrecia Ang; Demian Warheart; Alex Laris; Andrea Piña; Mich Laris; Lalo Jurado; Erick Ruiz

Velvet Darkness is a Mexican heavy metal band from Ciudad Satélite, Mexico, founded in 2013 by guitarist Joe SaraF and bassist Charles Kray. The band is known for their literature-based lyrics, mainly from fantasy and horror genres, and fantasy in general. Velvet Darkness has released songs based on J. K. Rowling’s Harry Potter characters, Stephen King’s Carrie, and Star Wars’ Obi-Wan Kenobi. Their power metal style has been compared to that of bands such as Helloween, Sonata Arctica or Avantasia.

== History ==
=== Formation, lineup changes and Delusion (2013–2015) ===
Velvet Darkness was formed during 2013 in Satellite City by guitarist Joe SaraF and bassist Charles Kray. Originally conceived as a hard rock cover band along Kray's brother, Eddie, who left after just a couple of months. A few months later, drummer Erick Ruiz joined the band, followed shortly after by singer Lucrecia Ang, guitarist Alex Laris, and keyboardist Andrea Piña. The band began to a change into a more heavy metal sound, adopting the name Velvet Darkness in September; the name “is a metaphor about the dark side we all have but don’t often let out”. A month later, Ruiz quit and was replaced by Lalo Jurado. After a couple of months, and just three weeks before their first gig, Jurado left the band, which urged them to get a replacement. Laris brother, Mich, played during that show on 16 February 2014 at Club Atlántico in Mexico City. Mich left the band shortly after their debut gig, being replaced by Rob “Teko” Yanez, and a couple of weeks later Piña was replaced by Ang's friend John Rai.

In April 2014, with a more stable lineup, Velvet Darkness began the writing process for what would be their debut EP, Delusion. Laris left soon afterwards, and the band enlisted guitarist Demian Warheart in September 2014.

Velvet Darkness went into the studio in March 2015 with producer and engineer Cheves Miranda. After Miranda's mixes got lost, the band rerecorded Delusion in June with Holkan Villavicencio at NeoRaziel Records in Mexico City. The band played Delusion for the first time in its entirety on 8 August at Cosa Nostra in Mexico City, and released the EP on 13 August. The 5-track EP included “Death Eaters”, which would become a live staple, usually as show closer. The band briefly toured throughout Mexico to promote the EP alongside Castillos de Cristal before starting to write their first LP.

=== Nothing But Glory and Ang’s departure (2016–2019) ===
Work on their debut album began in February 2016. Absence and departure of members started to delay the writing process. SaraF left temporarily the band from May to July, bringing Rich Cuevas as his replacement; Cuevas would become the band's substitute guitarist until 2019. In September, Ang left in order to pursue a master's degree in Spain, which prompted auditions, and in November, Kate Michaels joined the band. Michaels was friends with Kray's sister since high school, and was invited by her for an audition.

Recordings began in November 2016 with Castillos de Cristal's guitarist Israel Arcos as engineer, with Yanez laying down his drum sections. He later moved to San Jose, California for six months. Meanwhile, the rest of the band continued with the recording from February to April 2017 with Arcos. After being unsatisfied with that recording, the band rerecorded and mixed with Omar Hernández from August to September.

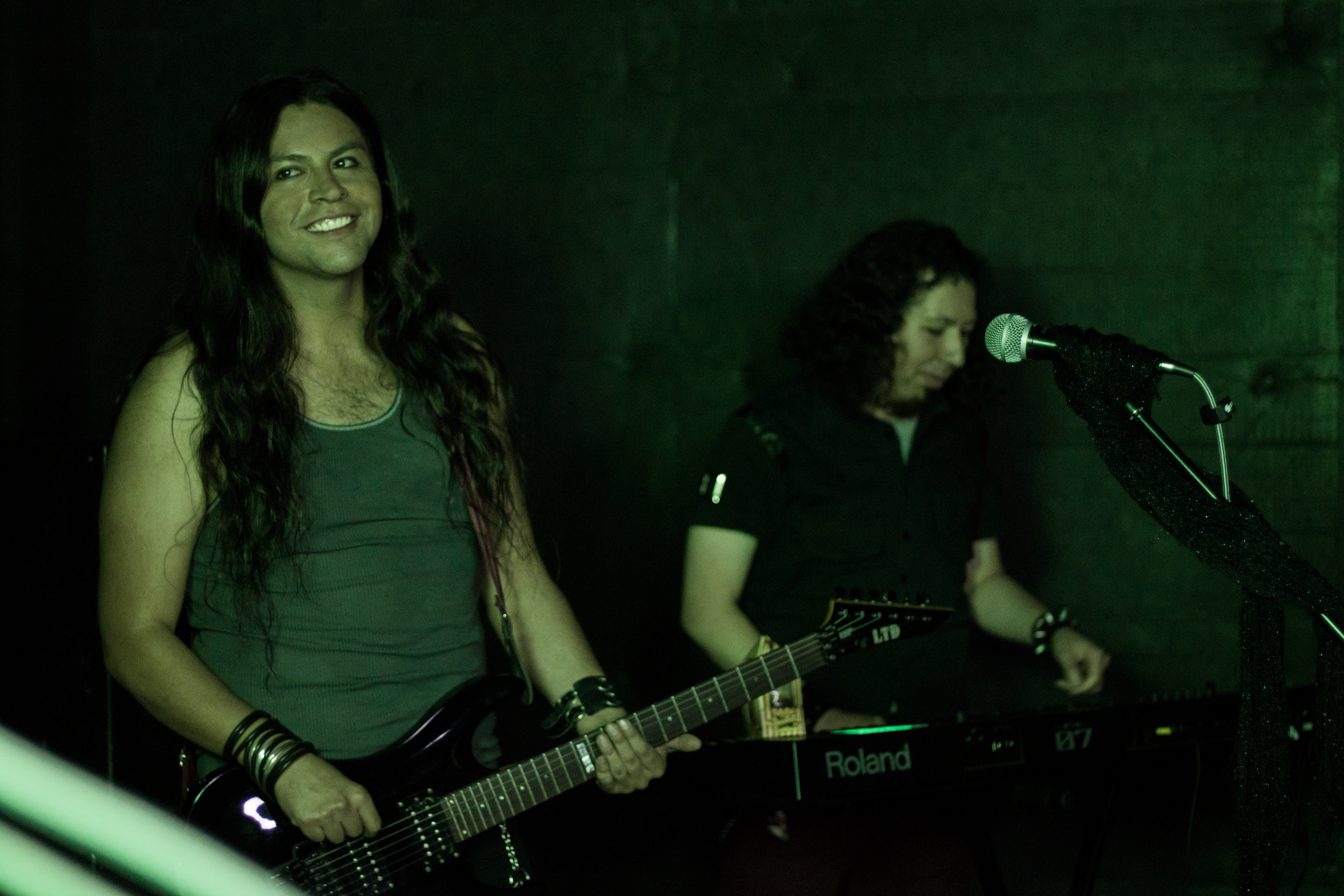
Demian Warheart and John Rai

In August 2017, Velvet Darkness joined management agency Treehouse Entertainment with manager Omar Pérez. Additional mixing work was made by David Pesina, who also mastered the album. On 26 February 2018, “Howling Hearts” was released as the album's first single; it featured Castillos de Cristal's singer Lalo Largher on vocals. In April, Rai won the 2017 Osmium Award for Best Keyboardist. On 7 May, the band announced the title for the album would be Nothing But Glory, and released “Break the Ice” as second single.

Nothing But Glory was released on 8 June 2018, followed by a more extensive national tour, including four dates with gothic band Lvto. The 10-track album included “Is It Me?”, a song not included on Delusion due to length issues; it also included rerecordings of “Death Eaters” and “The Wise Knight” with Michaels on vocals, only available on the CD version.

On 14 January 2019, Velvet Darkness released their first music video, a live recording of “Death Eaters”. It was released as single on digital platforms with the Michaels rerecording of “The Wise Knight” as side-B. The song, based on the characters of the same name from the Harry Potter books, and the music video got the band recognition from the Wizarding World fandom, considered “a step for magical music outside of the parameters of wrock”.

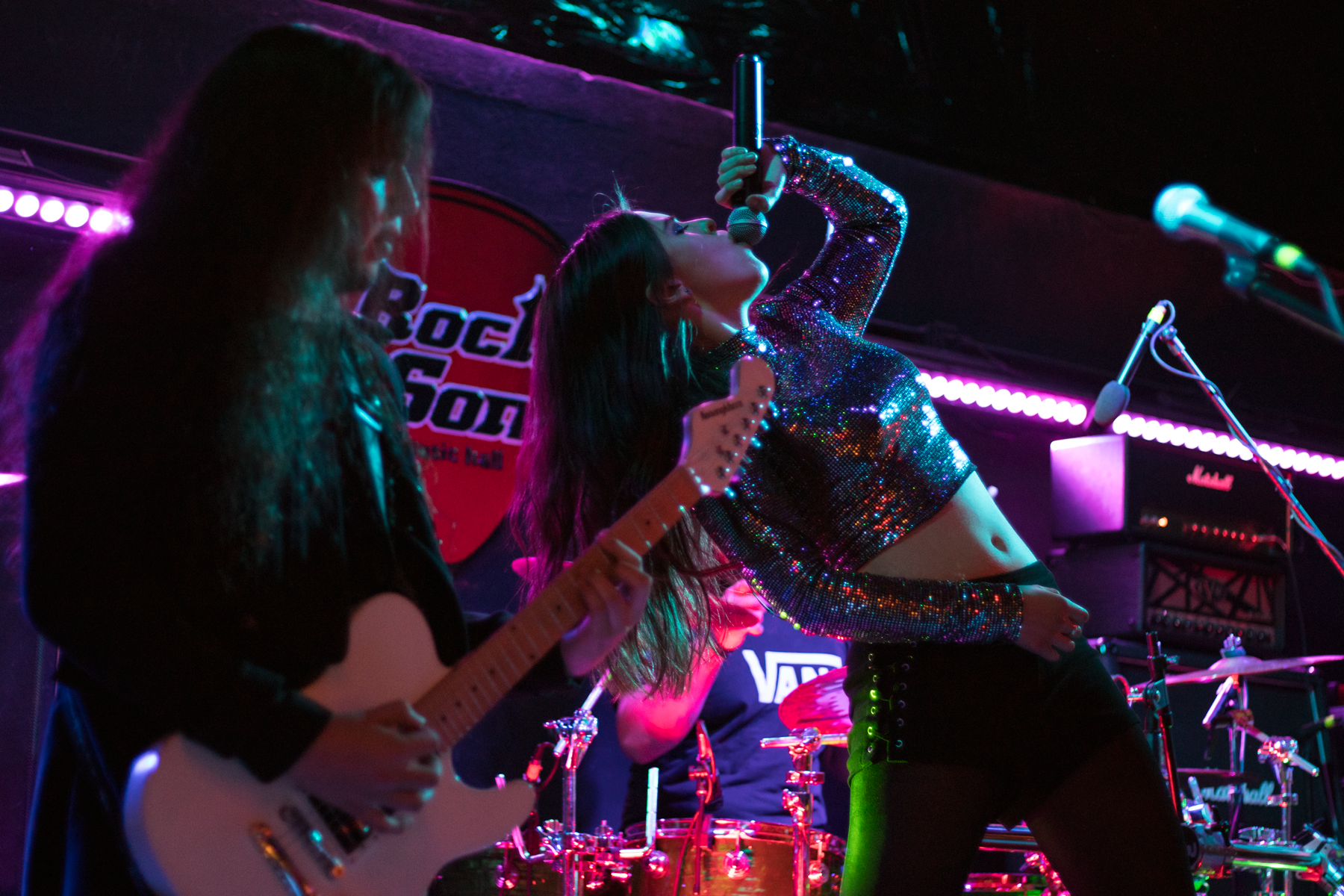
Joe SaraF and Kate Michaels live in 2019

On 22 February 2019, the band announced the departure of Warheart. On the same day, Rai moved to Japan, still contributing to the writing and recording process remotely; the band has refused to hire a substitute, using playback for keyboards and sequences during live shows. Cuevas, Reckoning’s Alfredo Murasaki and Altair served as live guitarists for the following months, the latter becoming official member on 9 October; he was introduced with a rerecording of “God of War”, song from Nothing But Glory. During the next two months, Velvet Darkness was supporting act for Alia Tempora and Lèpoka on their Mexican tours.

=== "Insomniac" and SaraF's departure (2019–2022) ===
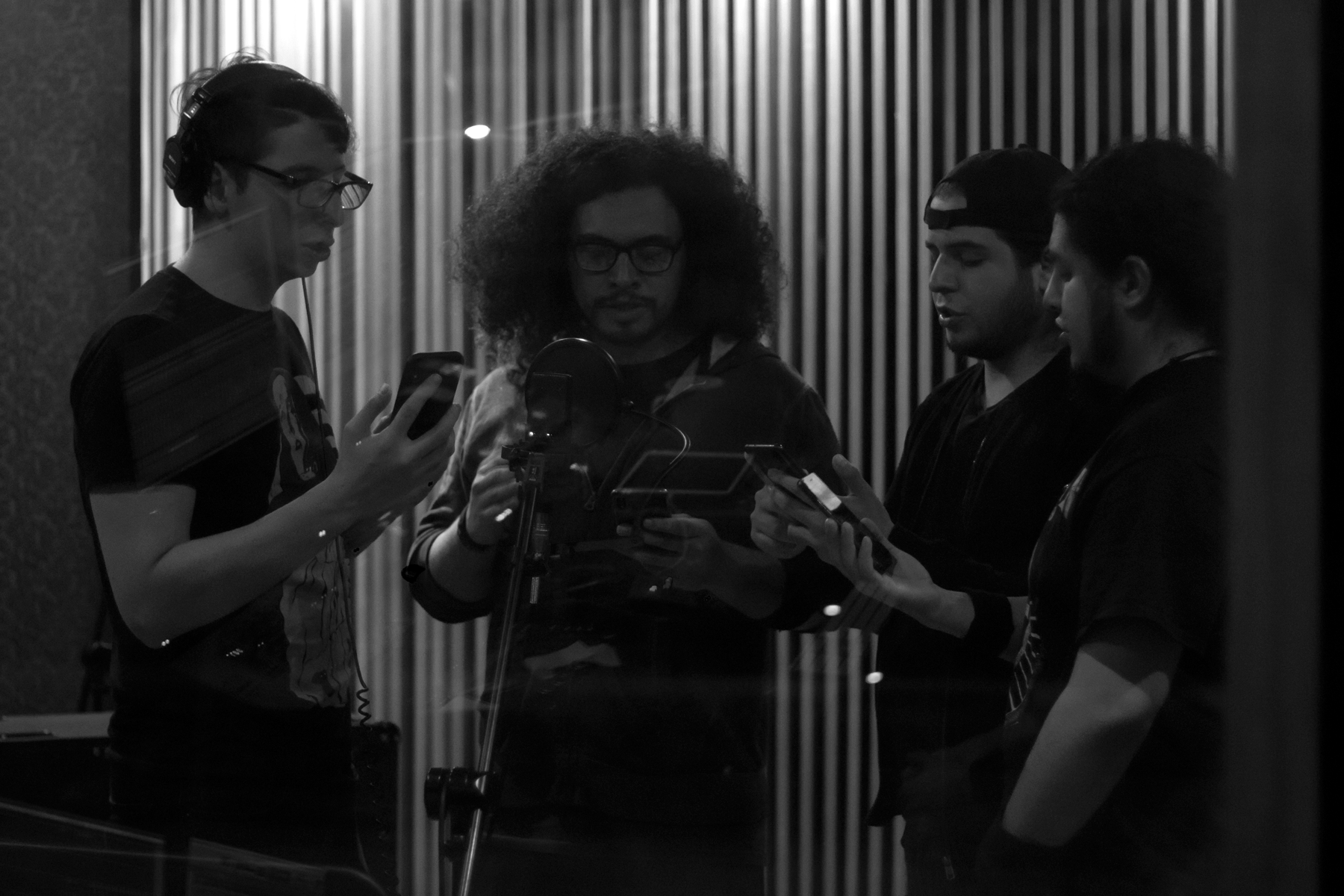
Velvet Darkness recording "Insomniac" at Sound Mob Studio

On 25 November 2019, Velvet Darkness released their first single with Altair as guitarist, "Insomniac", recorded at Sound Mob Studio in Mexico City.

In 2020, due to the COVID-19 pandemic, plans to record a new album got postponed. Instead, the band has released several virtual collaboration videos. On 4 May, as part of the Star Wars Day celebrations, they released a cover version of John Williams’s “Cantina Band” with members of bands such as Thrashsteel and Enso. On 8 June, being the second anniversary of Nothing But Glory, a video for the title track featured members from Jet Jaguar, Lvto, Driven, Everlight, Erzsebeth, Reckoning, and new collaborations with Ang and Largher. On 28 September, a cover version of Ozzy Osbourne's Bark at the Moon was released featuring Agora's Sergio Aguilar on guitar.

On 25 August 2020, the band released a new recording of the song "The Prince of Mist", this being the third song rerecorded from their EP Delusion so far, and the first to feature Altair. On 29 October, as part of Halloween celebrations, they released a cover version of Misfits' 1997 song Dig Up Her Bones with an alternate lineup: SaraF on vocals, Kray and Yanez on guitars, Altair on bass, and Michaels on drums.

On 29 June 2022, the band announced the departure of Joe SaraF citing personal motives, leaving Kray as the only founding member remaining. On 6 September 2022, Murasaki was introduced as the new guitarist.

=== Rise (2023–present) ===
On 8 July 2023, Velvet Darkness began the recording of their next material, again at Sound Mob Studio, with Agora's drummer Eduardo Carrillo as producer. Recording sessions lasted until 15 October. After the recording ended, Yanez left the band in December.

On 15 January 2024, "Rise" was released as the first single of the new recording, along with a music video. On 30 January, it was revealed that Rise will also be the title for the upcoming EP, and will consist on 5 tracks. Emilio Aparicio, who first appeared in the "Rise" music video, was introduced as the new drummer on 19 February.

== Members ==
=== Current members ===
- Charles Kray - bass, backing vocals (2013–present)
- John Rai - keyboards (2014–present)
- Kate Michaels - lead vocals (2016–present)
- Altair - lead guitar (2019–present)
- Alfredo Murasaki - guitars (2022-present)
- Emilio Aparicio - drums (2024-present)

=== Former members ===
- Lucrecia Ang – lead vocals (2013–2016)
- Alex Laris - guitars (2013–2014)
- Demian Warheart - guitars, backing vocals (2014–2019)
- Joe SaraF - lead guitar, backing vocals (2013–2022)
- Andrea Piña - keyboards (2013–2014)
- Erick Ruiz - drums (2013)
- Lalo Jurado - drums (2013–2014)
- Mich Laris - drums (2014)
- Rob “Teko” Yanez - drums (2014–2023)

=== Touring members ===
- Rich Cuevas - guitars (2016-2019)
- Alfredo Murasaki - guitars (2019)

== Discography ==
=== Studio albums ===
Year	Album details
2018	Nothing But Glory: Released: June 8, 2018; Label: Independent

=== EPs ===
Year	Album details
2015	Delusion: Released: August 13, 2015; Label: Independent
2024	Rise: Released: 2024; Label: Treehouse Entertainment

=== Singles ===
Year	Song	Album
2018	"Howling Hearts (ft. Lalo Largher)"	Nothing But Glory
2018	"Break The Ice"	Nothing But Glory
2019	"Death Eaters (Live Session)"	Non-album single
2019	"God of War ‘19"	Non-album single
2019	"Insomniac"	Non-album single
2020	"The Prince of Mist (Revisited)	Non-album single
2024	"Rise"	Rise

=== Music videos ===
Year	Song	Director
2019	"Death Eaters (Live Session)"	Axel Ramírez
2019	"God of War ‘19"	Marian AP
2024	"Rise"	Fey Unda
