= Geek rock =

Genre of rock music

- Other names: Nerd rock
- Stylistic origins: Nerd music; alternative rock; new wave; art-punk; college rock; indie rock; electronic; filk music; video game music
- Cultural origins: Late-1990s geek culture and nerd music, United States
- Typical instruments: Guitar; electronic instruments; unusual instruments
- Derivative forms: Nerd punk; Time Lord rock; Twi-rock; Wizard rock

Other topics
- Nintendocore; Nerdcore; Nerd-folk

Geek rock (also known as nerd rock) is a subgenre of alternative rock that draws influences from indie rock, college rock and nerd music. Characterized by traditional rock instrumentation combined with synthesizers, unusual instruments and song structures, as well as lyrical references to geek culture and specialized yet mundane interests, whimsy, and offbeat humor in general.

== Characteristics ==
Geek rock is characterised by strong use of both electronic instruments and more atypical musical instruments, such as accordions or ukuleles.

Lyrically, the genre is generally characterised by subject matter that covers topics such as geek media pop culture (including science fiction, comic books and video games), academia, technology and related topics. Kyle Stevens, co-founder of Kirby Krackle (along with Jim Demonakos), expands this to include any passionate interest, saying in a 2013 interview: "To us now, what we consider or genre of 'nerd' or 'geek' rock means anything we are really passionate about, whether that be traditionally geeky subject matter or a song about how we're really into tacos. In essence, they're love songs directed to whatever we're really passionate about." Irony, self-deprecation and humour are major elements.

While mainstream rock music tends to be aspirational, representing things the average male audience member wants or wants to be, geek rock celebrates the mundane, common things that its audience members would find familiar.

== Etymology ==
The term "nerd rock" was first used as the title of a 1977 sketch on the American sketch comedy series Saturday Night Live, named by writer Anne Beatts after Elvis Costello appeared as the musical guest star. She is on record as thinking, while watching his performance, "this isn't punk rock; this is nerd rock." The sketch was the first in their "The Nerds" series following the same "nerd" characters.

== History ==
=== Forerunners ===
The label "proto-geek rock" covers both similar musicians performing before the term was established and those that were adopted by geek culture but were not strictly part of it themselves. Alex DiBlasi contends that Frank Zappa is the archetypical geek rocker and antecedent of geek rock. Pitchfork notes Jonathan Richman's the Modern Lovers as "nervous nice-guy geek-rock that presages the Talking Heads". Other early influences include new wave acts such as Devo, Talking Heads, Robyn Hitchcock, Oingo Boingo, Elvis Costello, Thomas Dolby, the Dead Milkmen, and XTC, as well as Kansas art-punk band the Embarrassment who were described as forerunners to "geek-punk".

=== Origins ===
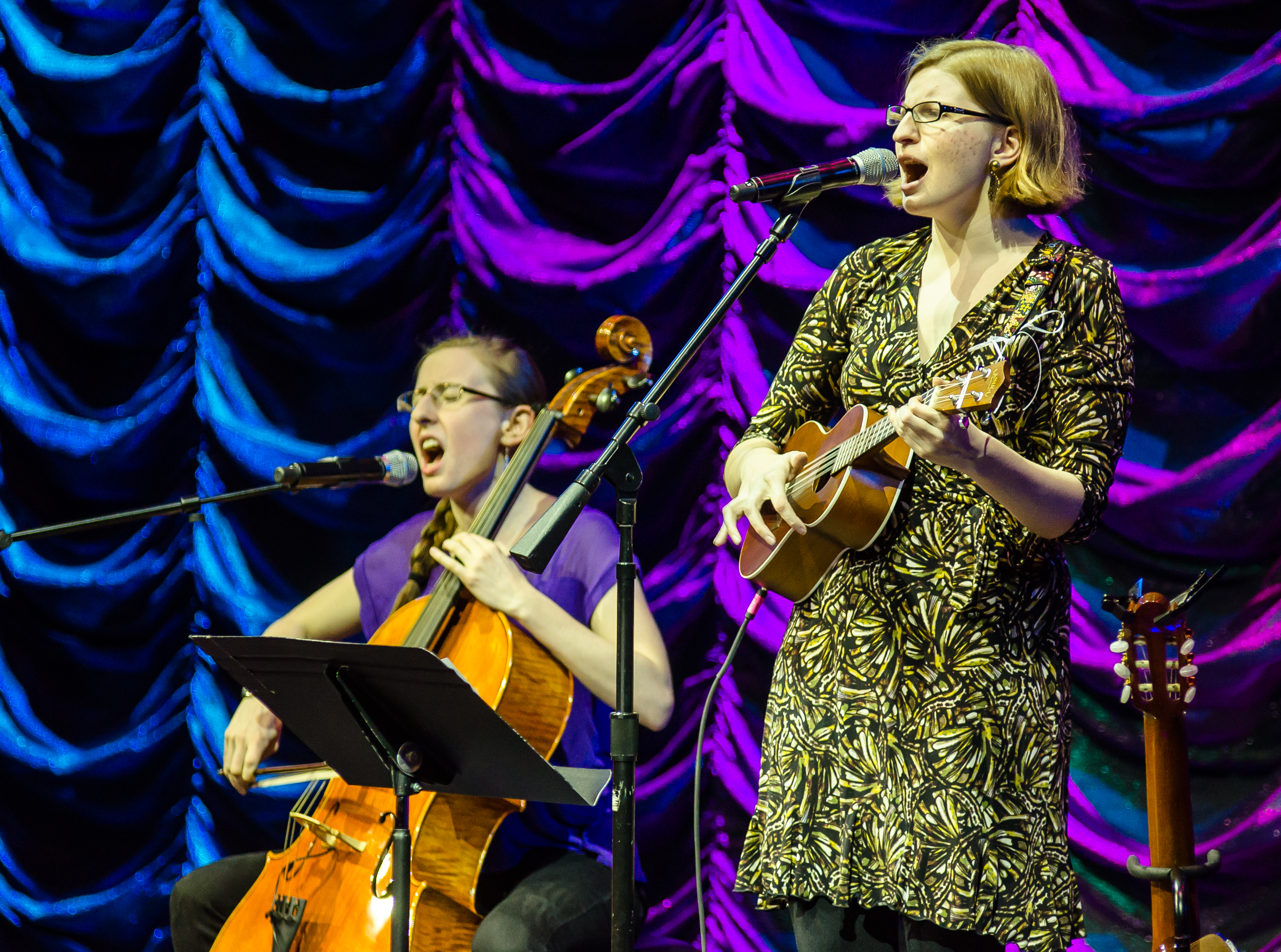
The Doubleclicks – Aubrey Turner and Laser Webber – performing onstage at JoCo Cruise Crazy 3

The first band to describe themselves as "geek rock" is believed to be Nerf Herder. The success of They Might Be Giants' 1990 album Flood may have begun making geek culture and geek rock more mainstream. Billboard has referred to They Might Be Giants as "Nerd-Rock Kings". Similarly, "Weird Al" Yankovic has been called the king of nerd rock.

Earlier filk music was based around fans performing at science fiction conventions. Geek rock, however, is not necessarily connected to conventions in the same way and, while often still connected to fandom, is more adjacent to the fan community than an out-growth of it. Geek rock musicians are professional rather than amateur and band members need not be fans themselves. For example, Chicago Doctor Who-based band Time Crash was started by Doctor Who fan Ronen Kohn but the band's drummer, Andy Rice, had not seen the TV series until some time after the band started. This was made possible by equipment becoming more affordable and the growth of the internet.

== Legacy ==
Geek rock, and related genres, have grown large enough to support music festivals such as Rock Comic Con. In 2024, a multimedia project titled, Generation Blue, was published, and focused on documenting the movement and rock band Weezer's influence on the scene.

== Related genres ==
Some subgenres and derivative forms of geek rock are focused around specific parts of geek culture and fandoms. Others are based on subgenres of rock music.

=== Nerd punk ===
Nerd punk (also known as geek punk) is a fusion of nerd music and punk rock. It shares the characteristics of geek rock with the fast-paced songs, hard-edged melodies and singing styles of punk. Bands include The Descendents, Guigui & the Tech Leads and Thundering Asteroids!.

=== Twi-rock ===
Twi-rock (or twirock) developed from Twilight fandom with bands such as the Bella Cullen Project. While initially successful, and entering into a rivalry with wizard rock, the twi-rock genre turned out to be short lived.

=== Time Lord rock ===
Time Lord rock (or trock) was developed by British band Chameleon Circuit in 2008. It was directly inspired by the existence of wizard rock. Time Lord rock was initially dominated by British and Australian bands but the genre has spread to the United States with groups such as Time Crash, Legs Nose Robinson and singer Allegra Rosenberg.

=== Wizard rock ===
Wizard rock (or wrock) developed from Harry Potter fandom in the United States with Harry and the Potters in the early 2000s. The subgenre has since expanded internationally with hundreds of bands and established its own music festival, called Wrockstock.

== See also ==
- Art punk
- New wave music
- Devocore
