= Rock Comic Con =

Music festival

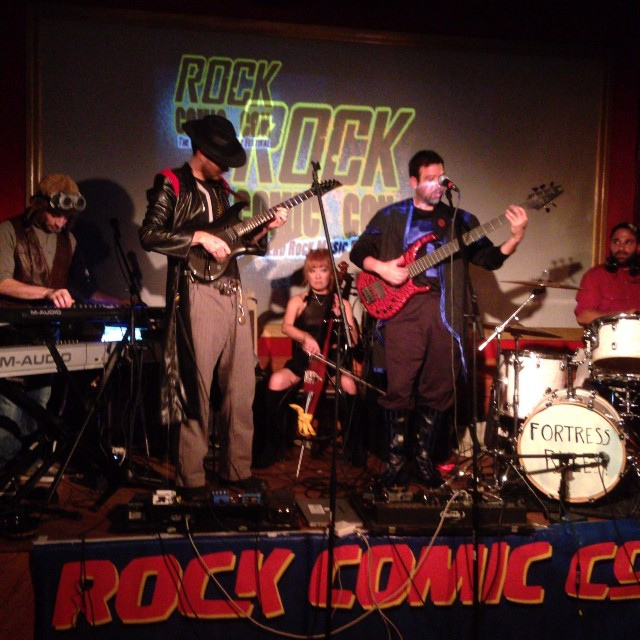
- Chronicles of Sound at Rock Comic Con 6 (Oct 2013)
- Genre: Nerd music
- Location: New York City/Denver
- Years active: 2010–2014
- Founders: Jon Price, Jeff LaGreca & Jeff LaGreca
- Website: rockcomiccon.com

Rock Comic Con was a touring nerd music festival created by Jon Price, Jeff LaGreca and Jeff LaGreca, all members of the band H2Awesome!, in 2010. It was originally held to complement that year's New York Comic Con but has been held along with Denver Comic Con and billed as its "official after-party". Proceeds from Rock Comic Con 1 went to the Comic Book Legal Defense Fund.

== Event history ==
Event	Date	Location	Performers
Rock Comic Con 1	October 9, 2010	Sullivan Hall, New York	Adam WarRock, Bedlam Rock, Fortress of Attitude, H2Awesome!, Kirby Krackle, Rachel Bloom (Fuck Me, Ray Bradbury)
Rock Comic Con 2	October 14, 2011	Tobacco Road, New York	H2Awesome!, Kirby Krackle, Paul and Storm
Rock Comic Con 3	June 16, 2012	Hard Rock Cafe, Denver	H2Awesome!, Mike Allred and GEAR, Paul and Storm, Random Battles
Rock Comic Con 4	October 12, 2012	Rebel NYC, New York	The Doubleclicks, H2Awesome!, Molly Lewis, Schäffer the Darklord
Rock Comic Con 5	June 1, 2013	Hard Rock Cafe, Denver	The Doubleclicks, H2Awesome!, Harry and the Potters, Kirby Krackle
Rock Comic Con 6	October 12, 2013	Pioneers Bar, New York	Chronicles of Sound, Daenerys and the Targaryens, Fortress of Attitude, H2Awesome!
Rock Comic Con 7	June 13–14, 2014	Armoury, Denver	Fri 13th: Danaerys and the Targaryens, Goldensole, Rainbow Dragon Eyes, Total Ghost Sat 14th: 3d6, H2Awesome!, Magic Cyclops, Pandora Celtica, Schäffer the Darklord
Rock Comic Con 8	October 9, 2014	Webster Hall, New York	H2Awesome!, Harry and the Potters, Kirby Krackle, Math The Band
