= Time Lord rock =

Music genre

- Stylistic origins: Alternative rock; wizard rock; geek rock
- Cultural origins: 2008 Doctor Who fandom; United Kingdom
- Typical instruments: Vocals, guitar, bass, drums, keyboards

Regional scenes
- Predominantly the United Kingdom and Australia.

Time Lord rock (sometimes shortened to Trock) is a genre of geek rock music based on, and about, the Doctor Who television series. It was created in 2008 in the United Kingdom with the formation of Chameleon Circuit.

== History ==
The first Doctor Who inspired songs were recorded during the Dalekmania of the mid 1960s. The most famous of these was the novelty song I'm Gonna Spend My Christmas with a Dalek, recorded by Newcastle band The Go-Go's in 1964. Other notable songs of this time included Who's Who? by Roberta Tovey, Frazer Hines' album Time Traveller, and also the Third Doctor Jon Pertwee's hit single Who is the Doctor.

In 1988, The KLF released the single "Doctorin' the Tardis" under the alternative band name The Timelords, which reached number 1 in the UK singles chart as well as charting in other countries. However, the group never released anything else under this name or with the same subject, nor did any other band follow up on the single, leaving it as a novelty rather than a genre.

In the summer of 2008, Alex Day, a fan of Doctor Who, was inspired by the growing phenomenon of wizard rock (formed from Harry Potter fandom) to begin writing songs about Doctor Who, dubbing the resulting genre "Time Lord Rock" (abbreviated to "Trock", after the "Wrock" abbreviation used for wizard rock). Charlotte McDonnell (formerly Charlie McDonnell), also a fan, did the same, and released an acoustic video performance of "Blink" on YouTube. Combined with the Scottish vloggers Liam Dryden and Chris Beattie, they formed the first Time Lord rock band, Chameleon Circuit.

Time Lord rock performers are usually British or Australian. Chicago-based Time Crash may have been the first American band playing in the genre. In 2013 Legs Nose Robinson became a trock-rocking American band picking up the new genre and broad in range. "references to the series, while present, are subtle, with styles ranging from glam-tinged rock to a burlesque reminiscent of Kurt Weill."

== Groups and performers ==
- Chameleon Circuit
- The Doctor's Daughter
- Mr. Saxon
- Allegra Rosenberg
- Time Crash
- Turn Left
- Legs Nose Robinson

== See also ==
- Music of Middle-earth, music from or otherwise inspired by Tolkien's legendarium
- Wizard rock, music based on the Harry Potter franchise
