= Time Crash (band) =

Time Lord rock Chicago-band

- Origin: Chicago, United States
- Genres: Trock, geek rock
- Years active: 2012–2021
- Members: Ronen Kohn; Dave Kitsberg; Michael Fye; Andy Rice; Chris Rice
- Website: timecrashband.com

Time Crash was a Time Lord rock group from Chicago. The band formed between June 2011 and June 2012 following a Facebook post by vocalist Ronen Kohn. The concept of the band was inspired by wizard rock and bands like Harry and the Potters. Time Crash's first EP was recorded in July 2012 and their live debut was in September 2012.

== History ==
Little Amelia
A short sample of "Little Amelia" from the band's album Regeneration (2014).

In 2011 Ronen Kohn, while working on a solo album, watched a lot of Matt Smith-era Doctor Who and thought "my entire brain is full of Doctor Who right now, and if I write any song it's going to secretly be about Doctor Who." Initially, he considered putting oblique references to the show in his music but, aware of wizard rock bands like Harry and the Potters, decided to follow their model and create music dedicated to Doctor Who. In June 2011 Kohn posted a notice on Facebook to see if anyone else was interested. Dave Kitsberg responded to this post a few hours later and brought in Michael Fye. Kitsberg, now lead guitarist, wanted an appropriate custom guitar and turned to his friend and guitar-builder Chris Rice. Rice began watching Doctor Who for information and had completed the rebooted series in a few days before moving on to the classic series. He built the custom guitar, the GuiTARDIS, and joined the band himself on steel guitar. Rice brought in the fifth member of the band, his brother Andy Rice, as the drummer. Andy Rice was not a Doctor Who fan himself and was initially, jokingly, banned from watching any episodes to maintain an outsider point of view. The Rice brothers joined in June 2012, the band recorded their first EP, Little Amelia, in July and made their live debut in September. Initially they played local bars and have also played at conventions.

On stage, the band wore fezzes and long striped scarves; they often began their sets with the line "Are you my mummy?" (from the episode "The Empty Child"). Their fans, "Crashers", often wear bow ties and suspenders (to mimic the Eleventh Doctor) and hold sonic screwdrivers in the air. The Time Lord rock genre was created by British band Chameleon Circuit and Time Crash believed they were the first American band in the genre.

In December 2021, the official Time Crash Twitter account published a tweet officially announcing that the band was dissolving.

== Band members ==
- Ronen Kohn (vocals/rhythm guitar)
- Andy Rice (drums)
- Michael Fye (bass guitar)
- Christopher Rice (steel guitar)
- Dave Kitsberg (lead guitar—the guiTARDIS)

== Discography ==
=== Little Amelia ===
An EP recorded at Solid Sound in Hoffman Estates in July 2012.

No.	Title	Length
1.	"Little Amelia"	4:50
2.	"The Last Human"	3:54

=== Regeneration ===
A full studio album released in September 2014 and funded by a Kickstarter campaign with 211 backers pledging $6,680.

No.	Title	Length
1.	"Who Am I"	4:00
2.	"Good Morning"	3:40
3.	"Little Amelia"	4:56
4.	"Oi Spaceman"	3:00
5.	"The Last Human"	4:35
6.	"Metacrisis Man"	4:34
7.	"No Place Like House"	2:51
8.	"I Don't Want To Go"	3:13
9.	"His Last Words"	3:59
10.	"Trust Me"	3:34
11.	"Heart of the TARDIS"	4:30

=== The Empty ===
EP, released May 2016.

No.	Title	Length
1.	"At the Door"	2:46
2.	"Jamie"	4:35
3.	"Mister Clever"	3:14
4.	"Never Fall in Love Inside a TARDIS"	3:24
5.	"Hidden Track"	7:37

=== Carol of the Cloister Bell ===
A Christmas single, released in December 2019.

No.	Title	Length
1.	"Carol of the Cloister Bell"	3:20
