= The Legend of Butch & Sundance =

2004 TV film

- Written by: John Fasano
- Directed by: Sergio Mimica-Gezzan
- Starring: David Clayton Rogers; Ryan Browning; Rachelle Lefevre; Blake Gibbons; Jay Brazeau
- Music by: Basil Poledouris
- Country of origin: United States
- Original language: English

Production
- Producers: Stanley Brooks; Greg Gugliotta
- Running time: 1 hour 26 minutes

Original release
- Release: October 10, 2004

The Legend of Butch & Sundance is a 2004 American Western television film directed by Sergio Mimica-Gezzan about Butch Cassidy and the Sundance Kid. This was the last film scored by composer Basil Poledouris.

== Plot ==
Butch Cassidy receives a pardon after being incarcerated for a year under the condition that he does not commit any more crimes in Wyoming. He later joins forces with the Sundance Kid and his relative Mike Cassidy's gang as adversaries of the Pinkerton Agency. The gang becomes known as the Wild Bunch after Mike Cassidy dies. A love triangle develops between Butch, Sundance, and photographer Etta Place.

== Production ==
Originally, The Legend of Butch & Sundance was intended as a television pilot for a series with NBC produced by Stanley Brooks and Greg Gugliotta and written by John Fasano. In an interview with True West Magazine's Tim Lasuita, Fasano said "The initial idea for the Butch and Sundance project came from some reading that I had done a couple of years ago[...] I had read two books about Butch, one by his sister who claimed that he and Sundance had faked their deaths in Bolivia and had lived out their lives in the Pacific Northwest until the 1930s, and another that claimed that they had died in Bolivia after the shoot-out [in 1908]. I took that contradiction and thought, 'What a great film that would make.'" Fasano later said that the production team strove for historical accuracy. Actor David Clayton Rogers said he practiced gun handling and horseback riding for the role of Butch Cassidy.

== Cast ==
- David Clayton Rogers as Butch Cassidy.
- Ryan Browning as Sundance Kid.
- Rachelle Lefevre as Etta Place.
- Blake Gibbons as Durango.
- Jay Brazeau as Railroad Company Executive.
- Michelle Harrison as Mary Margaret Place.
- Susan Ruttan as Mrs. Place.
- Mark Consuelos as Sergeant Sanchez.
- Michael Biehn as Mike Cassidy.
- Marty Antonini as Simpkins.
- Hamish Boyd as Elzy Lay.
- Tom Carey as Walsh.
- Mara Casey as Barmaid.
- John Escobar as Priest.
- John Fasano as Blacksmith.
- Lucia Fasano as Cantina Girl.
- Greg Lawson as Pinkerton #2.
- Jaime Alvarez as Photographer.
- Steve Strachan as Train Pinkerton.
- Peter Skagen as Stockholder.
- Silva Helmer special skills extra (dancing scene).

== Reception ==
True West Magazine's Henry Cabot Beck reviewed The Legend of Butch & Sundance unfavorably stating "I don't suppose this family-friendly picture would offend anyone who wants to see a return of a Kenny Rogers-type Oater, but true buffs who want an adult and ambitious Western had best look elsewhere." DVD Talk's Paul Mavis called the film "an engaging comedy romance oater that holds up quite nicely against its more famous cinematic inspiration. Too bad this didn't sell into a series; that's a missed opportunity." Western Movies: A Guide to 5,105 Feature Films" Michael R. Pitts reviewed the film with "Lame plotted TV movie lacks historical background but does have good photography."

== Bibliography ==
- Pitts, Michael R. Western Movies: A Guide to 5,105 Feature Films. McFarland, 2012.
