= Franchise =

Franchise may refer to:

== Arts, entertainment, and media ==
- Media franchise, a grouping of comparable creative works, especially in North American usage, including movies, video games, books, etc.
- "Franchise" (short story), a 1955 short story by Isaac Asimov
- Dem Franchize Boyz, an American hip-hop group from Atlanta
- Franchise Times, a business magazine for franchises in the United States
- "Franchise" (song), a 2020 song by Travis Scott
- Franchise: The Golden Arches in Black America, a 2020 book by Marcia Chatelain that won the Pulitzer Prize for History
- Franchise Pictures, a film production company

== Business ==
- Franchising, a business strategy that includes licensing of trademarks and methods of doing business to franchisees
- Franchise, a privilege to operate a type of business such as a cable television provider, public utility, or taxicab company, sometimes requiring the filing of tariff schedules, as in:
  - Television franchise, a right to operate a television network
    - Cable franchise, a right to operate a cable television network
      - Cable television franchise fee, an annual fee charged by a local government to a private cable television company
  - Passenger rail franchising in Great Britain, a system of contracting out the operation of the passenger services on the railways of Great Britain
- Franchise deductible, a kind of damage amount threshold in an insurance contract

== Politics and law ==
- Franchise, political franchise, or suffrage, the right to vote an election or a referendum
- Franchise jurisdiction, in English history, a jurisdiction held as private property

== Sports ==
- Franchise, a term for a team in the type of professional sports league organization most commonly found in North America; see North American professional sports league organization
  - Franchise player, a player on such a team around whom an entire competitive squad can be built
  - Franchise tag, a designation of a player in the American National Football League whose contract is soon to expire that binds them to the team for one year at an enhanced salary
- Sports league franchise, or League franchise, a local or regional business franchising operation under a particular sporting league in activities such as pool, darts, etc.

== See also ==
- The Franchise (disambiguation)
