= Chainmail and Cello =

Studio album by The Doubleclicks
- Released: April 30, 2012
- Recorded: Materials to Outlet Studios in Portland, Oregon
- Genre: Nerd-folk

The Doubleclicks chronology
Beta Testing 1-2-3 (2010)	Chainmail and Cello (2012)	Worst Superpower Ever (2012)

Chainmail and Cello is the debut album by nerd-folk duo The Doubleclicks as The Doubleclicks. It was released on 30 April 2012. An earlier demo album, called Beta Testing 1-2-3 (2010) was recorded under the more-generic band name "Angela and Aubrey Webber Version 1.0".

== Reception ==
Erik Henriksen of The Portland Mercury wrote that "A surprising number of musicians pander to geeks eager to hear anyone acknowledge Firefly, but the Doubleclicks' music—sharp and clever, with a heavy dose of melancholy—comes from a more universal place." Mark Riechers makes a similar point in The Daily Madison Isthmus, saying that "[Their] enthusiasm makes their songs [...] feel honest, referencing aspects of geek culture to serve a decent song, rather than to pander to an audience of nerds eager for a song about playing Halo." While mostly positive, Riechers goes on to add "But as in the case for many bands in this subgenre, many Doubleclicks songs often boil down to waiting for the punchline of the song to arrive. [...] It means that some of their songs have a fleeting, jokey quality to them."

For the individual songs, Ken Maiuri in the Daily Hampshire Gazette highlights the "melancholy heart" of "Will They or Won't They". Riechers notes that "This Fantasy World" "tempers references to dungeon masters [...] with other, more pressing real-life concerns," and that "Clever Girl" (previously released separately as "Hollywood Raptor") "sounds like a song about girls' body-image issues until the listener realizes that the song is directed at velociraptors."

== Track listing ==
No.	Title	Length
1.	"Oh, Mr. Darcy"	3:16
2.	"Spock Impersonator"	2:14
3.	"The Nerdy Birthday Song"	1:01
4.	"Apostrophe"	2:11
5.	"No Easy Way"	2:34
6.	"Clever Girl"	1:10
7.	"The Way I Glow"	2:46
8.	"The Internet National Anthem"	2:13
9.	"Don't You Love Me?"	3:11
10.	"Will They or Won't They?"	2:25
11.	"Worst Superpower Ever"	2:24
12.	"A Lullaby For Mr. Bear" (adult version)	2:09
13.	"A Song about EVE Online"	2:05
14.	"Ironically"	3:18
15.	"This Fantasy World" (explicit version)	2:57
