= The Franchise (band) =

- Origin: Washington, D.C., USA
- Genres: Rock, geek rock
- Years active: 2004–2008
- Members: David Barak; Noah Kaye; Jackson Maier; Patrick Nolan
- Past members: Anna London; Jerry Marzouk
- Website: [deleted]

The Franchise was a Washington, D.C.–based rock band. Their music was described as "geek rock", delving into the harrowing world of pet monitoring devices, comic books, and Middle Eastern food. Influences include what used to be called “college rock,” alternative rock, and New Wave—things along the lines of Talking Heads, R.E.M., They Might Be Giants, U2, The Cure, XTC, Cake, early The Police.

Patrick Nolan played drums in the jazz band Kurds and Whey from 1991 to 1993, and then released a solo album, Gone Astray in 2003.

David played guitar in the rock band The Sunmasons from 1989 to 1992, and released one cassette, It's OK, I'm with the BAND in 1991. He then went on to sing in the a cappella group Makela along with Jerry Marzouk.

Noah and Jackson were both singers in the Spizzwinks(?).

Patrick and David started playing together in 2003, and in 2004 invited Jerry to join them as a keyboard player. They then asked their friend Anna London to join them as she learned to play bass.

== Demolition ==
Shortly after forming, they recorded Demolition at Hit & Run Studios in Gaithersburg, Maryland. Demolition had three original songs, Aliyah L'Regel, Post-Apocalyptic Love Song, and Cyrano, and a cover of The Police song Message in a Bottle.

Cover art for Demolition was created by Patrick.

Shortly after releasing Demolition, Noah Kaye joined the band after attending one of the early performances.

== The Sound and the Furry ==
In early 2005, they recorded most of the tracks for The Sound and the Furry, live at Avalon Recording studios in Bethesda, Maryland. Two of the songs, Lojack and King of Falafel, were recorded at the Brass Monkey Saloon in Baltimore, Maryland, and Late Summer was recorded at Umbrella Studios in Arlington, Virginia.

The cover art was an homage to the Beatles album Let it Be, featuring the band's pets.

Almost immediately after Figmental Records released The Sound and the Furry, Jerry left the band, and Noah took on primary vocal duties.

== To the Rescue! ==
In 2006, they decided to record another album with a more 'produced' sound, and returned to Hit & Run Studios to do so. DC comic artist Jake Warrenfelz was commissioned to design the cover, which envisioned the band defending the US Capitol from attack by a giant squid.

Before the recording was finished, Anna left the band, and the other members took turns filling in for her on the CD. Jackson Maier replaced her shortly before the CD was released, but after the recording was finished.

== Lingua Franchise ==
In 2008, they completed another album and hosted their launch party at The Grog and Tankard in Washington, DC on June 7, 2008.
