= Wizard rock =

Genre of rock music themed on the Harry Potter franchise

- Stylistic origins: Harry Potter series; geek rock
- Cultural origins: Early 2000s, United States

Regional scenes
- United States

Other topics
- Do it yourself; Filk music; Time Lord rock

Wizard rock (or Wrock) is a type of novelty rock music and filk music themed around the Harry Potter franchise. The music was largely prevalent in the United States in the early 2000s. Wizard rock initially started in Massachusetts with Harry and the Potters, though it has grown internationally.

== Characteristics ==
Leading bands in this genre include Harry and the Potters and Draco and the Malfoys. Although most listeners of the genre are fans of Harry Potter, some bands have attracted listeners outside of the books' fanbase. Wizard rock songs are often written from the point of view of a particular character in the books, usually the character who features in the band's name. In contrast to mainstream bands that have some songs incorporating literary references among a wider repertoire of music (notably Led Zeppelin to The Lord of the Rings), wizard rock bands take their inspiration entirely from the Harry Potter universe. When performing live, wizard rock bands often cosplay, or dress as, characters from the novels. Some bands perform at fan conventions.

== History ==
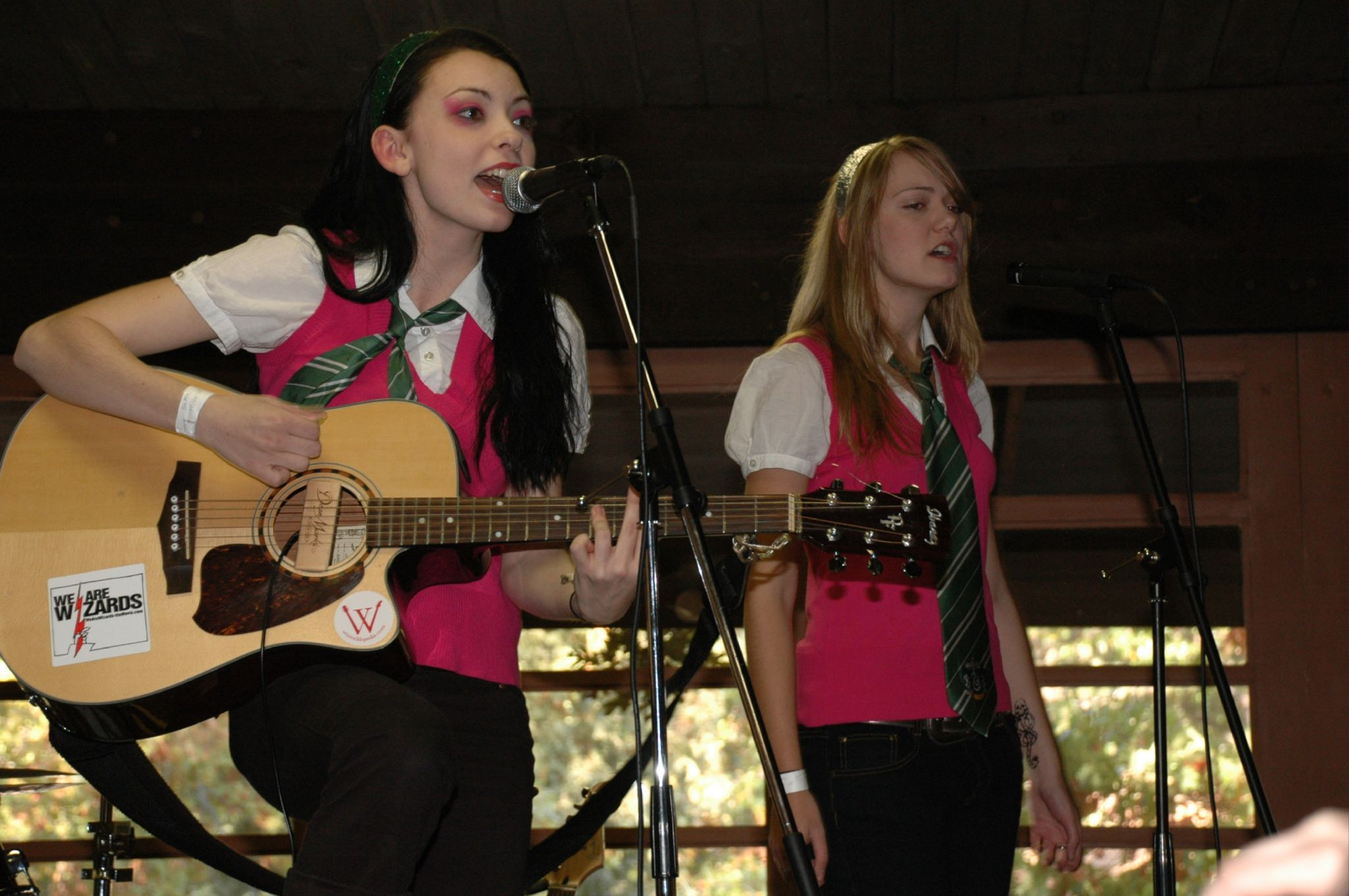
The Parselmouths, a wizard rock band consisting of Brittany Vahlberg and Kristina Horner, perform during Wrockstock in 2007, displaying the Harry Potter-themed costumes common within the genre.

The earliest Harry Potter-themed song is conventionally traced to 2000 when the Los Angeles-based pop-punk band Switchblade Kittens released an "Ode to Harry" from the perspective of Ginny Weasley. Harry and the Potters originated the Harry Potter-themed band, which became the genesis of a fandom-centered genre of music called wizard rock. As Harry and the Potters increased in popularity, other wizard rock bands emerged. Brian Ross and Bradley Mehlenbacher originally conceived Draco and the Malfoys as a parody of Harry and the Potters performing at a local house party. In April 2005, Matt Maggiacomo invited Harry and the Potters to play at an all-Harry Potter show at his Rhode Island home. That night, Maggiacomo made his debut as The Whomping Willows, and his friends, Mehlenbacher and his brother, Brian Ross, played for the first time as Draco and the Malfoys.

There were also festivals focused on the genre such as Wrockstock, which was first held in 2007 in the United States and ended in 2013 after six editions.

In 2015, Mexican band Velvet Darkness released the song "Death Eaters" as part of their debut EP Delusion. It was later re-recorded in 2018 as a bonus track for their debut LP Nothing but Glory, and a music video for the song was released in 2019 with a live recording of it. "Death Eaters" has led the band to play at several Harry Potter-themed events, playing both their songs and heavy metal covers of the movies' soundtracks.

As of 2021, there remains a small but active wizard rock scene. Notable events include the Wrock from Home and O.W.L. Fest online music festivals; the annual Wizard Rock Sampler compilation series; and websites such as Wizrocklopedia and the Facebook group "Wizard Rock Revival" see much activity, with dozens of active musical acts and thousands of fans. Bandcamp currently features many wizard rock releases from past and current bands.

== See also ==
- Harry Potter fandom
- Filk
- Music of Middle-earth, music from or otherwise inspired by Tolkien's legendarium
- Time Lord rock, filk genre based on Doctor Who
