= Wrockstock =

Defunct music festival in the United States

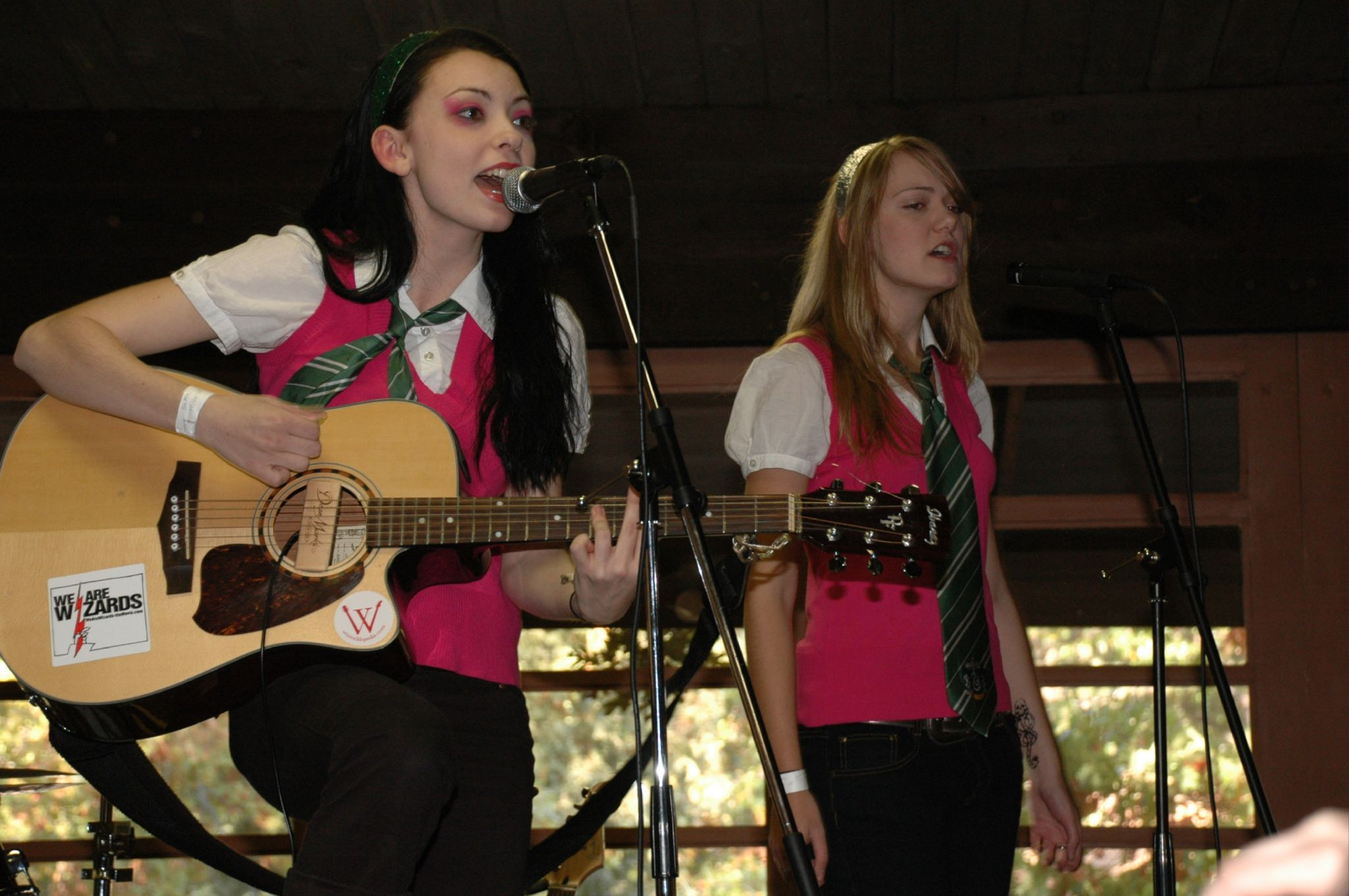
- The Parselmouths perform during Wrockstock in 2007
- Genre: Wizard rock
- Location: United States
- Years active: 2007–2011, 2013
- Founders: Abby Hupp
- Website: www.wrockstock.com

Wrockstock was a yearly music festival featuring wizard rock, music inspired by the world of Harry Potter. Its name is a play on the music festival Woodstock. Wrockstock was first held in 2007. Organized by Abby Hupp, it was the first large Wizard Rock gathering of its kind that was not part of a general Harry Potter fan conference. It took place at the YMCA summer camp near Ozark, Missouri. The first year it was titled "WRockstock Spooktacular". It doubled as a fundraiser for the Harry Potter Alliance, a charitable foundation run by Harry Potter fans. Its final festival was in 2013.

The events were broadcast live over the internet for those unable to attend in person.

== Festival history ==
Event	Dates	Notes
WRockstock Spooktacular	October 26–28, 2007	
Wrockstock II	May 23–26, 2008	15 bands, more than 300 attendees.
Wrockstock III	November 6–9, 2009	500 attendees
Wrockstock IV	November 5–8, 2010	
Wrockstock V	October 28–31, 2011	
Wrockstock Reunited	July 26–28, 2013	Held in Saint Louis

== Culture ==
A recurring joke is about "Uncle Carl" who allegedly drives the Knight Bus to pick up attendees for Wrockstock.

== See also ==
- Harry Potter fandom
- List of music festivals
