= The Doubleclicks =

Nerd-folk musical duo

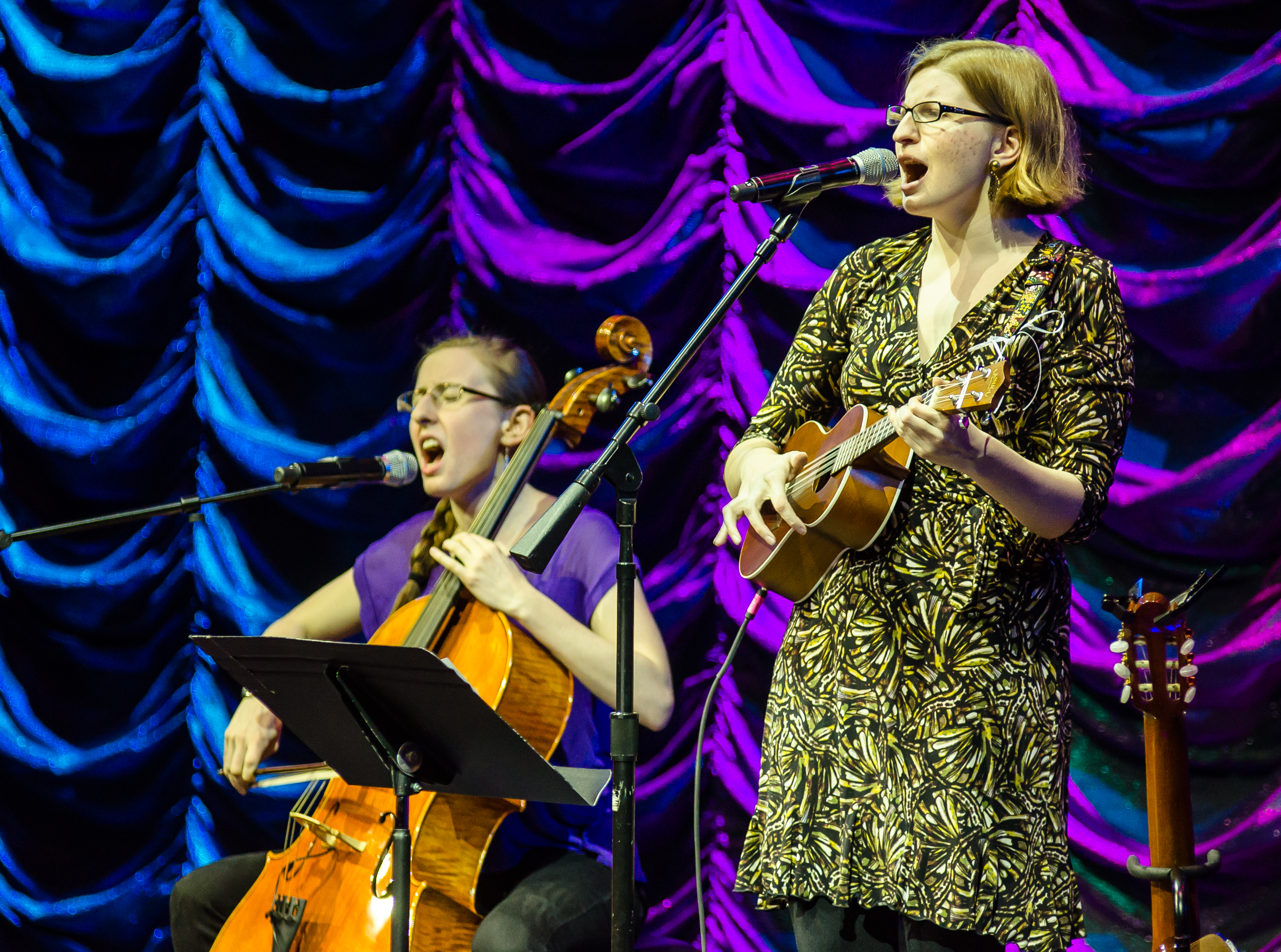
- The Doubleclicks performing in 2013.

Background information
- Origin: Portland, Oregon, United States
- Genres: Nerd-folk, Comedy, Singer-Songwriter, Geek rock
- Instruments: cello, guitar, ukulele, electronics
- Years active: 2011–present
- Members: Aubrey Turner; Laser Webber
- Website: thedoubleclicks.com

Nothing to Prove
A short sample of "Nothing to Prove" from the duo's second album Lasers and Feelings (2013).

Dimetrodon
A short sample of "Dimetrodon" from the duo's third album Dimetrodon (2014).

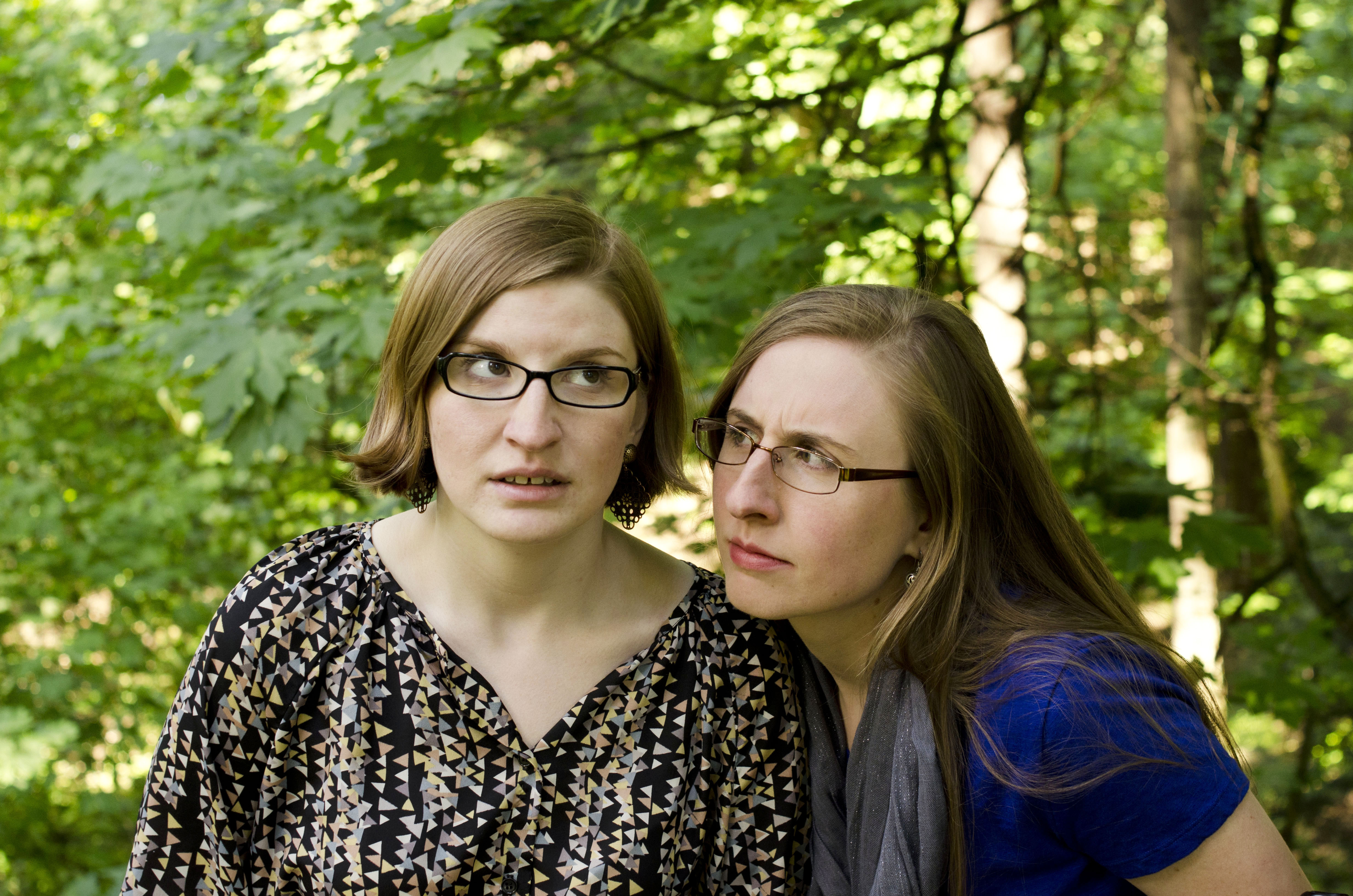
Laser Webber (left) and Aubrey Turner (right)

The Doubleclicks are a nerd-folk musical duo based in Portland, Oregon and Los Angeles, California, consisting of siblings Laser Webber (formerly Angela Webber and Laser Malena-Webber) and Aubrey Turner (formerly Aubrey Webber). They first became known for performing nerd-friendly comedy music, including songs about Dungeons & Dragons, dinosaurs, and other geeky themes. While their later songs retain those elements, there has been a stronger focus on feminist and other social issues, and more personal themes.

== History ==
=== Personal ===
Aubrey is the older sibling; Laser was born on November 16. The Webber siblings grew up in Westford and Boston, Massachusetts listening to the Smothers Brothers (particularly their version of "Streets of Laredo"), "Weird Al" Yankovic and Tom Lehrer. They are part of a musical and artistic family; their father, Stephen Webber, is a music professor at Berklee College of Music, and they claim to have been playing music since before they could read; their mother, Susan Webber, is a fiber artist and former Spanish teacher. Both attended Abbot Elementary, where they first learned to use stringed instruments, and Westford Academy, with Aubrey graduating in 2003 and Laser in 2006. They were part of a rock band in high school but had no plans to form a duo. Laser moved to Portland, Oregon to study International Affairs at Lewis & Clark College (with a year at the Anglo-American University in 2008) and Aubrey studied classical cello at the Berklee College of Music before moving to Portland as well. Both siblings married within a year of each other in 2016-2017, resulting in the changes to their respective last names. In 2019, Laser came out as trans and nonbinary; Laser used they/them pronouns at the time, and later identified as a trans man and started using he/him. Laser's marriage has ended.

=== The Doubleclicks ===
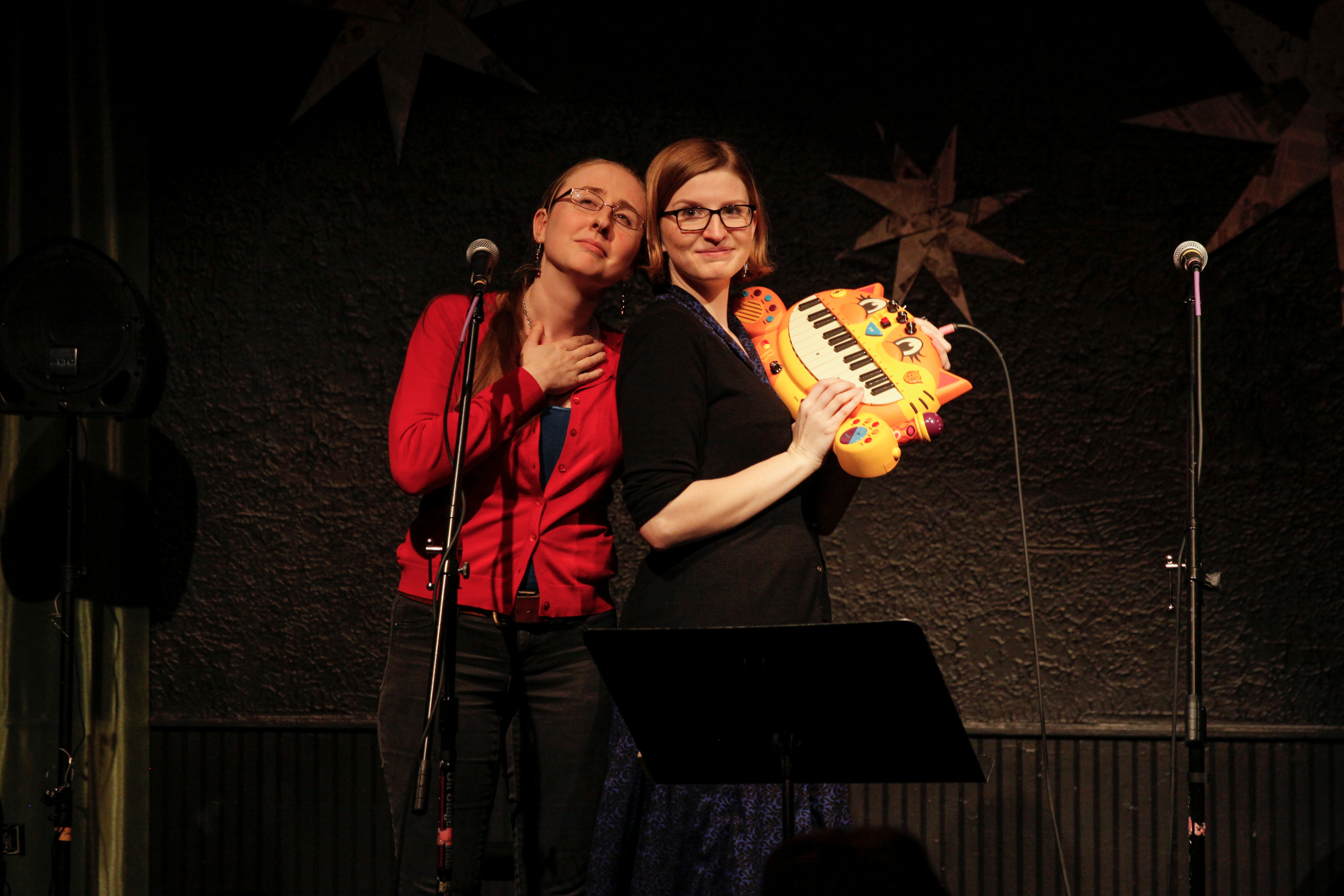
The Doubleclicks in January 2014 (Laser holding the cat keyboard)

The siblings performed as a duo on open mic nights before booking a real gig at Mississippi Pizza. At first, the band was a part-time endeavour. Laser worked as a freelance writer and journalist, at the Beaverton Valley Times and Portland Mercury, while Aubrey was a home-care provider for seniors. The band started their YouTube channel in 2011 with a 6-month song-a-week project and has since been releasing songs on YouTube and CD and touring throughout the US. They write many songs that are funny and emphasize geeky topics. Laser initially wrote most of the songs, but has described their more recent songs as a collaborative effort. They often perform at pop culture conventions, at entertainment events such as w00tstock, and in nontraditional music venues such as comic shops and game stores.

Their second album, Lasers and Feelings, debuted at #7 on Billboard's Comedy Albums chart. Their fourth album, President Snakes, debuted at #4 on the same chart and moved to #2 the following week. The following albums, Love Problems and The Book Was Better, each debuted at #1 on that chart.

The Doubleclicks made a video for their song "Nothing to Prove" about acceptance of women in geek culture. The video featured appearances from celebrities including Kelly Sue DeConnick, Wil Wheaton and Adam Savage—and was covered in print and online media, gaining over 1 million views on YouTube.

In 2014, The Doubleclicks ran a Kickstarter campaign to raise funds for their third album, Dimetrodon, produced by Mike Phirman. The campaign raised over $80,000 and was the most successful Portland music Kickstarter to date. Laser quit his day job in December 2011, while the success of the Kickstarter campaign allowed Aubrey to quit her job as well, leaving both siblings able to work full-time on being the Doubleclicks.

== Music ==
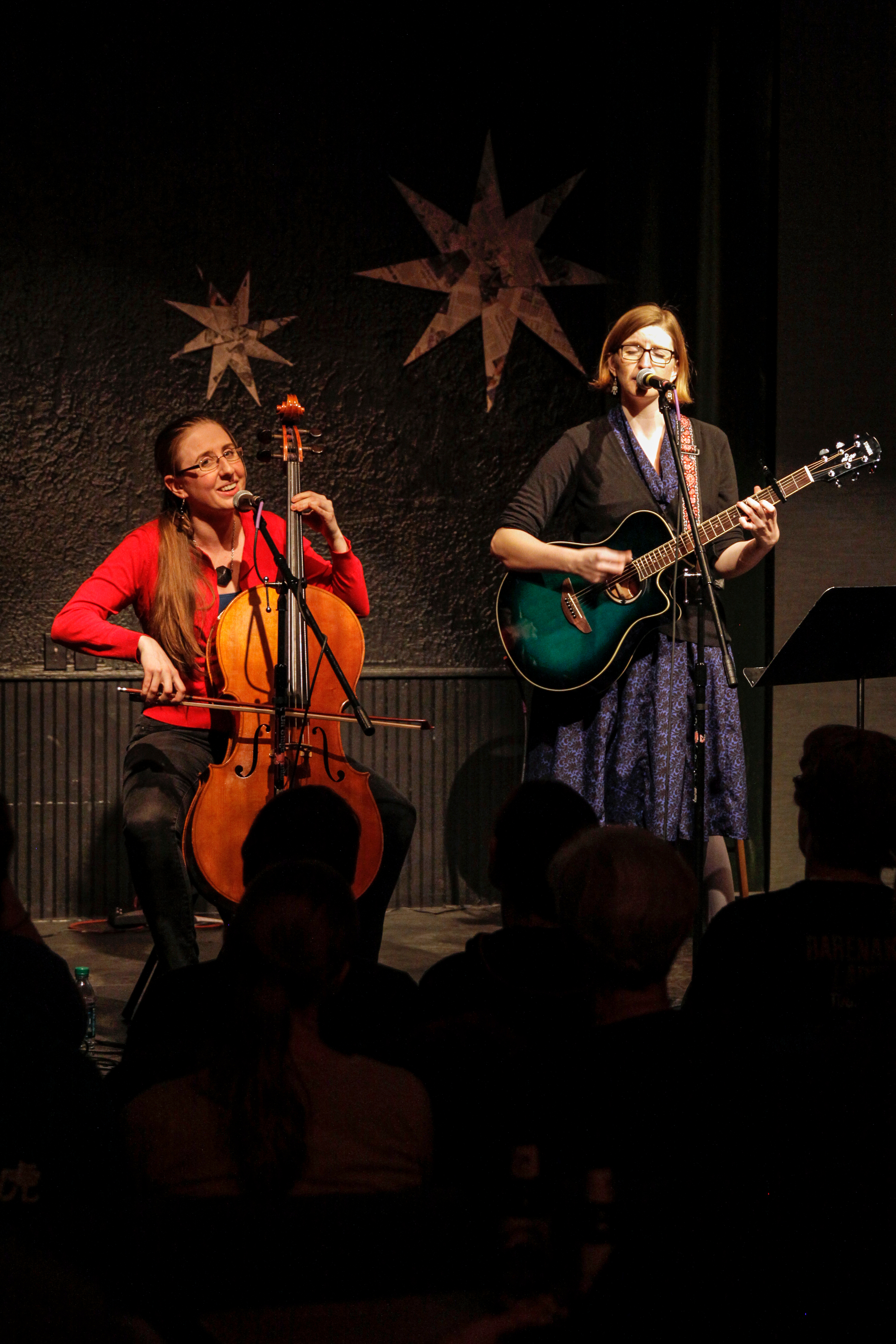
The Doubleclicks performing in January 2014

Commonly the lyrics to their songs are written by Laser while Aubrey creates the music.

The Doubleclicks have described themselves as part of the nerd-folk genre; which is similar to geek rock and nerdcore but without either drums or rapping. Their participation in geek music was not originally intended; it grew naturally from their music and allowed them to tap into the nerd community. Laser stated in 2012, "I don't know if we ever really intended to write 'geeky music'—and that's not exclusively what we do. I write songs about things I think about, which are love, depression, and games and movies" and later, in 2014, "Everybody has self-important, sad love songs. We were doing something that was still earnest, but instead of talking about trees or nature or clubbing, we were using World of Warcraft as a metaphor for sadness." Separately in 2014, he further explained "Our songs are essentially about feelings and about our own experiences. It just happens to be that the metaphors we are making are nerdy ones because those are the cultural touchstones we have." With the increase in the geek demographic, the duo believes that the "geek music" distinction may be becoming redundant.

The group has toured and performed with other performers of geek-friendly music, including Molly Lewis, Danielle Ate the Sandwich, and Lucia Fasano. They have been featured performers at Jonathan Coulton's annual JoCo Cruise, and Coulton sang on one track of their 2017 album Love Problems.

== Discography ==
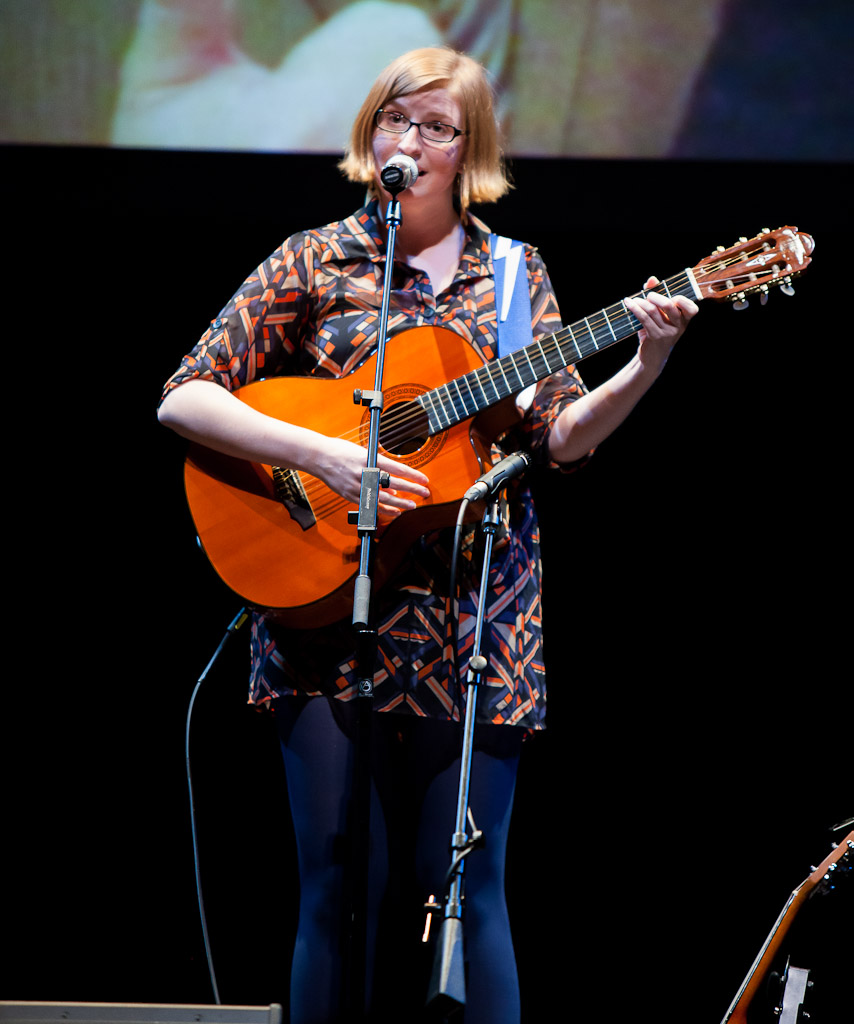
Laser Webber in 2012

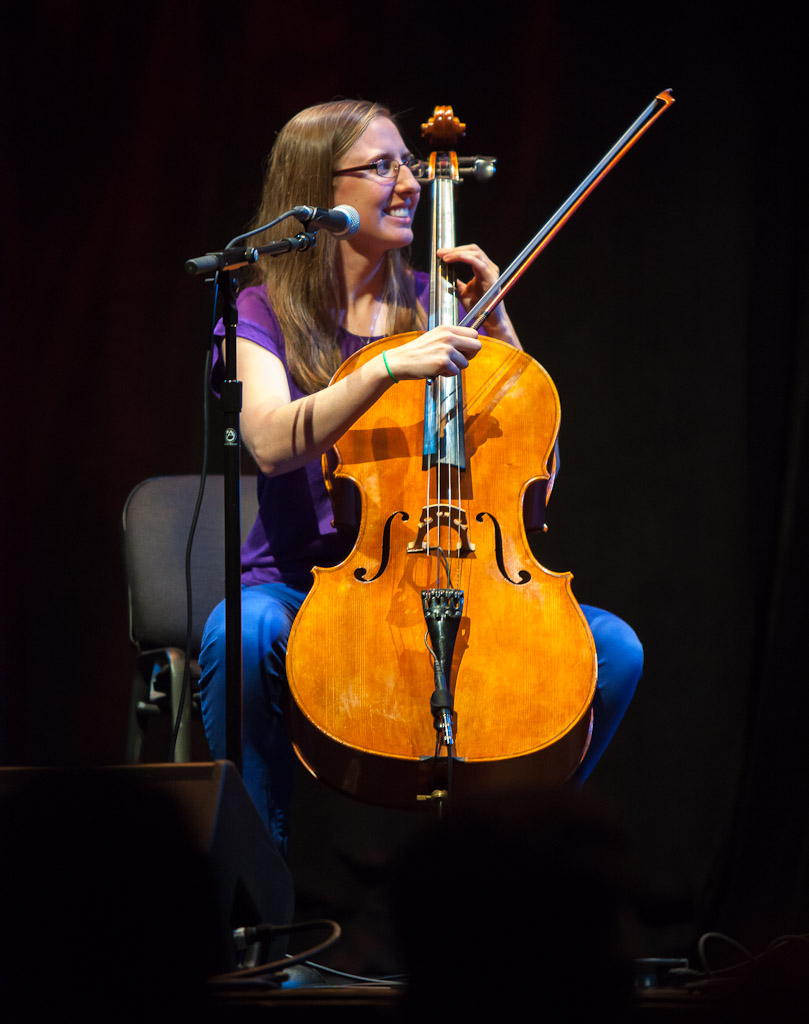
Aubrey Turner in 2012

=== Demo album ===
- Beta Testing 1-2-3 (CD & online, March 2011)

=== Studio albums ===
- Chainmail and Cello (CD & online, April 2012)
- Lasers and Feelings (CD & online, July 2013)
- Dimetrodon (CD & online, June 2014)
- President Snakes (CD & online, August 2015)
- Love Problems (CD & online, August 2017)
- The Book Was Better (CD & online, May 2019)

=== Live / "greatest hits" album ===
- Dinosaurs and Feelings: Live and Great Hits (online only, April 2022)

=== EPs ===
- Blatant Pandering (online only, August 2011)
- Worst Superpower Ever (CD & online, April 2012)
- Christmas Ain't About Me (CD & online, December 2012)

=== Compilation albums ===
- Song-a-week (Demos) (online only, February–September 2011)
- Song Fu 2012 (online only, January–December 2012)
- Weekly Song Wednesday (online only, September–December 2013)
- Monthly Song Monday (online only, March 2014-?)
- Weekly Song Wednesday: Season Two (online only, May 2014-July 2014)
