= Nerd music =

Musical subculture

Nerd music (or geek music) is the overall category of music collecting the musical genres that grew from nerd culture; different styles that share the same common ground.

== History ==
=== Origins ===
The earliest example was filk music, from the 1950s onwards, played by fans at science fiction conventions. Towards the end of the 20th century and the beginning of the 21st century, other styles of music developed. Factors that made this possible were the increasing affordability of equipment, the growth of the internet and the increase in the nerd-geek demographic.

== Nerd folk ==
Nerd-folk (also nerd folk, geek-folk, or dork-folk) is a musical genre derived from filking that features humorous original songs involving geeky topics performed in a folk style. Laser Malena-Webber and Aubrey Turner of The Doubleclicks credit Marian Call and others with creating the genre. The genre is related to filking and other nerd music genres such as nerdcore hip-hop and geek rock (alternative rock).

== Events and festivals ==
The music festival Nerdapalooza (2007–2013) described itself as "the first of its kind to invite all genres of the nerd music movement under one roof, including nerd rock, nerdcore hip hop, chiptunes, and video game music." Other conventions and events such as MAGFest and Rock Comic Con have since hosted nerd music acts of a range of styles.

== See also ==
- Music of the My Little Pony: Friendship Is Magic fandom
- Fictional music
