= Let's Choose Love =

2026 single by UMFELD

Single by UMFELD
- Released: August 7, 2026
- Recorded: 2026
- Genre: Pop, Acoustic, Latin, Downtempo, House, Reggae, Synthpop
- Length: 2:45 (Original Version); 2:42 (Acoustic Version); 2:42 (Latin Rework); 4:00 (Downtempo Rework); 2:57 (Classic House Rework); 3:03 (Reggae Rework); 2:43 (Synthwave Rework); 2:33 (Latin Percapella); 2:49 (Close Harmony Version)
- Label: Hilversongs
- Songwriter: Pierre Oitmann
- Producer: Pierre Oitmann

UMFELD singles chronology
"We Are the World United" (2026)	"Let's Choose Love" (2026)	"Come Dance Through the Darkness" (2026)

"Let’s Choose Love" is a song by Dutch music project UMFELD. It was the project's second single, originally released on August 7, 2026 by the independent label Hilversongs. It features lead vocals by UK pop singer and BRIT School graduate Eden Hunter (credited as Ruby Ryder) and backing vocals by Nigerian close harmony group RIZYN.

Besides the original version, several distinct alternate mixes were issued as 2-track singles, pairing vocal and 'dub' versions. Six full vocal versions of these alternate mixes were collected on the EP Let’s Choose Love (The Reworks), published on September 4, 2026. On October 16, six dub versions were grouped on the EP Let's Choose Love (Autumn Dubs).

For the single releases of both the original and acoustic version of "Let’s Choose Love" alternate mixes of the previous single, "We Are The World United", were used as B-sides.

== Development and release ==
"Let’s Choose Love" was written by music journalist Pierre Oitmann, during a train ride on April 3, 2022, when he went to visit his parents. At this point in time, the term 'choose love' had been in use by various initiatives, like the fund-raising social movement Let’s Choose Love, the global humanitarian aid organisation Choose Love, and the non-profit organisation Choose Love Movement founded by Scarlett Lewis, whose six-year old son was killed in the Sandy Hook Elementary School shooting in December 2012. However, according to UMFELD, the song was primarily written as 'a direct response to all the major events going on in the world at the time — and still', referencing the 2022 Russian invasion of Ukraine. Footage of the Bucha massacre started to emerge two days prior to writing the song, although the chorus idea originated a few weeks earlier.

The lead vocalist credited for "Let's Choose Love" is Ruby Ryder, which is a pseudonym for Eden Hunter. The nickname refers to her red hair, and references the DC Comics character of the same name. Prior to lending her vocals to the UMFELD single, Hunter released her debut EP The Circus Man and appeared on the charity single "Your Light Will Shine", dedicated to the late RuPaul's Drag Race UK winner The Vivienne. On its day of release, US duo Play-N-Skillz shared a story on Instagram featuring "Let's Choose Love".

=== Artwork ===
The cover image was created by Oitmann as well. It shows a heavily stylised representation of a heart symbol against a white background with the title written across it in blocky, white lettering. The sloppy red colouring represents a filled-out ballot, which ties into the song’s premise of opting to "choose love". The image was repurposed for alternate single and EP covers of the song in a variety of colours.

== Composition ==
=== Influences ===
The original version was described as "a pop song with 1980s drums, an EDM-style build-up, a Beach Boys-like choir, and a dash of Eurovision". Early 80s synthpop bands like The Human League, a-ha, and Alphaville were also mentioned as influences, as well as Stock Aitken Waterman, Pet Shop Boys, and "a little bit of Avicii". Following the original release, the song was remixed in various genres, mostly from the realm of electronic music, including downtempo, synthwave, and house music, as well as reggae.

=== Music and lyrics ===
Lizzy & Nora, the Jack Russell terrier siblings that can be heard on "Let's Choose Love", photographed in April 2008.

"Let’s Choose Love" is a fast-paced dance-pop song at 135 BPM, written in the key of E major. The original mix opens with a short orchestral section, with singer Eden Hunter whispering the line: "Come dance through the darkness." Meanwhile the backing vocalists perform a choral crescendo, right before an acoustic guitar starts strumming the first verse. Over the course of the song arps and chords played by synthesizers are mixed to the foreground, before a breakdown in the bridge highlights the vocal harmony choir. The main mix and Reggae Rework both include a 2016 audio recording of Oitmann's parents' pet dogs, named Lizzy and Nora, layered behind the drum track. As such, they are credited as "guest vocalists".

Thematically, the song ties into UMFELD’s previous single, "We Are the World United", echoing similar sentiments of solidarity and pacifism, while at the same time offering a decidedly more individualistic view, with the lyrics being written from a first-person perspective instead of the former song’s first-person plural form. It also differs by leaving out symbolism or imagery related to spirituality or religion, instead focussing on "getting by in everyday life, no matter the circumstances". From lead vocalist Eden Hunter's perspective, as a queer artist and a staunch supporter of LGBTQ rights, the song also relates to the acceptance of sexual and gender minorities. The song’s publisher stated "Let’s Choose Love" is about hope and human resilience. The title of the follow-up single, "Come Dance Through the Darkness", is lifted from the opening line of "Let's Choose Love".

== Track listings ==
Let’s Choose Love track listing
No.	Title	Writer(s)	Producer(s)	Length
1.	"Let’s Choose Love"	Pierre Oitmann	Oitmann	2:45
2.	"We Are The World United (Classic House Rework)"	Oitmann	Oitmann	3:35

Let’s Choose Love (Acoustic Version) track listing
No.	Title	Writer(s)	Producer(s)	Length
1.	"Let’s Choose Love (Acoustic Version)"	Oitmann	Oitmann	2:42
2.	"We Are The World United (Percapella Version)"	Oitmann	Oitmann	1:49

Let’s Choose Love (Latin Rework) track listing
No.	Title	Writer(s)	Producer(s)	Length
1.	"Let’s Choose Love (Latin Rework)"	Oitmann	Oitmann	2:42
2.	"Let’s Choose Love (Latin Dub)"	Oitmann	Oitmann	2:42

Let’s Choose Love (Downtempo Rework) track listing
No.	Title	Writer(s)	Producer(s)	Length
1.	"Let’s Choose Love (Downtempo Rework)"	Oitmann	Oitmann	4:00
2.	"Let’s Choose Love (Downtempo Dub)"	Oitmann	Oitmann	4:00

Let’s Choose Love (The Reworks) track listing
No.	Title	Writer(s)	Producer(s)	Length
1.	"Let’s Choose Love (Classic House Rework)"	Oitmann	Oitmann	2:57
2.	"Let’s Choose Love (Latin Rework)"	Oitmann	Oitmann	2:42
3.	"Let’s Choose Love (Reggae Rework)"	Oitmann	Oitmann	3:03
4.	"Let’s Choose Love (Downtempo Rework)"	Oitmann	Oitmann	4:00
5.	"Let’s Choose Love (Synthwave Rework)"	Oitmann	Oitmann	2:43
6.	"Let’s Choose Love (Acoustic Version)"	Oitmann	Oitmann	2:42

Let’s Choose Love (Reggae Rework) track listing
No.	Title	Writer(s)	Producer(s)	Length
1.	"Let’s Choose Love (Reggae Rework)"	Oitmann	Oitmann	3:03
2.	"Let’s Choose Love (Reggae Dub)"	Oitmann	Oitmann	3:03

Let’s Choose Love (Latin Percapella) track listing
No.	Title	Writer(s)	Producer(s)	Length
1.	"Let’s Choose Love (Latin Percapella)"	Oitmann	Oitmann	2:33
2.	"Let’s Choose Love (Acoustic Version)"	Oitmann	Oitmann	2:42

Let’s Choose Love (Synthwave Rework) track listing
No.	Title	Writer(s)	Producer(s)	Length
1.	"Let’s Choose Love (Synthwave Rework)"	Oitmann	Oitmann	2:43
2.	"Let’s Choose Love (Synthwave Dub)"	Oitmann	Oitmann	2:43

Let’s Choose Love (Classic House Rework) track listing
No.	Title	Writer(s)	Producer(s)	Length
1.	"Let’s Choose Love (Classic House Rework)"	Oitmann	Oitmann	2:57
2.	"Let’s Choose Love (Classic House Dub)"	Oitmann	Oitmann	2:57

Let’s Choose Love (Close Harmony Version) track listing
No.	Title	Writer(s)	Producer(s)	Length
1.	"Let’s Choose Love (Classic House Dub)"	Oitmann	Oitmann	2:57
6.	"Let’s Choose Love (Close Harmony Dub)"	Oitmann	Oitmann	2:49

Let’s Choose Love (Autumn Dubs) track listing
No.	Title	Writer(s)	Producer(s)	Length
1.	"Let’s Choose Love (Classic House Dub)"	Oitmann	Oitmann	2:49
2.	"Let’s Choose Love (Latin Dub)"	Oitmann	Oitmann	2:42
3.	"Let’s Choose Love (Reggae Dub)"	Oitmann	Oitmann	3:03
4.	"Let’s Choose Love (Downtempo Dub)"	Oitmann	Oitmann	4:00
5.	"Let’s Choose Love (Synthwave Dub)"	Oitmann	Oitmann	2:43
6.	"Let’s Choose Love (Close Harmony Dub)"	Oitmann	Oitmann	2:49

== Personnel ==
Credits adapted from Spotify.

Musicians

- Pierre Oitmann – programming, keyboards, finger snaps, additional vocals (on some versions)
- Eden Hunter (credited as Ruby Ryder) – lead vocals, harmony vocals
- Samuel Osaroekiye – harmony vocals
- Emmanuel Onubuogu – harmony vocals
- Nanya Ijeh – harmony vocals
- Lizzy & Nora – guest vocals (original and reggae version)
- Federico Tarquini – acoustic guitar (original and acoustic version)

Technical

- Pierre Oitmann – mixing engineer, mastering engineer
