= BRIT Trust =

Charity of the UK recorded music industry

- British Record Industry Trust
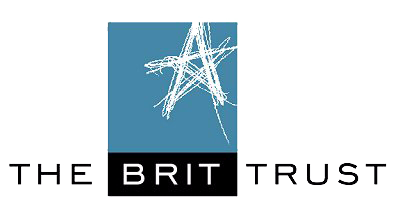
- Formation: 1989; 36 years ago
- Legal status: Non-profit company
- Region served: United Kingdom
- Chairman: Tony Wadsworth
- Website: brittrust.co.uk

British Record Industry Trust, trading as BRIT Trust, is a recorded music charity in the UK, established in 1989 by UK record labels. Its mission is to "improve lives through the power of music and the creative arts". It is directed by a team of trustees, led by Tony Wadsworth, who was appointed chair of The BRIT Trust in February 2021, taking over from John Craig.

It is funded largely by money raised each year by the BRIT Awards and also by the annual Music Industry Trust awards dinners (MITS), and has made more than 230 grant commitments totalling over £27 million to a wide range of causes and charities.

== BRIT School ==
The BRIT School in Croydon has been a major beneficiary of BRIT Trust funding, and was set up shortly after the Knebworth concert of 1990 where Dire Straits, Elton John, Jimmy Page, Paul McCartney and Pink Floyd, and more, performed to support The BRIT Trust.

Since its establishment in 1991, the BRIT School include alumni such as musicians Adele, Leona Lewis and Loyle Carner, as well as actors including Blake Harrison, Tom Holland and Cush Jumbo.

== Other charity partners ==
The BRIT Trust has been a long-term supporter of Nordoff Robbins, the UK's leading independent music therapy charity; as well as East London Arts & Music (ELAM), the games design, music and film and television college for 16- to 19-year-olds situated in East London.

It also supports the British Phonographic Industry's BRITs Apprentice Scheme, which since 2018 has each year given up to 10 individuals from diverse backgrounds looking to start out in the music business a high-quality, paid opportunity to fast-track their careers with small-to-medium independent music companies.

The BRIT Trust has recently broadened its educational remit to also incorporate mental health and well-being, and has since supported charities such as Mind, which has developed programmes to encourage awareness of mental well-being in the workplace, Music Support, which provides counselling for those who work in music who may struggle with addictions or with demands placed on them by their careers, and Key4Life, which helps young men in prison, or at risk of going to prison, to find more positive pathways through their love of music.
