= JT Lewis =

American school safety advocate

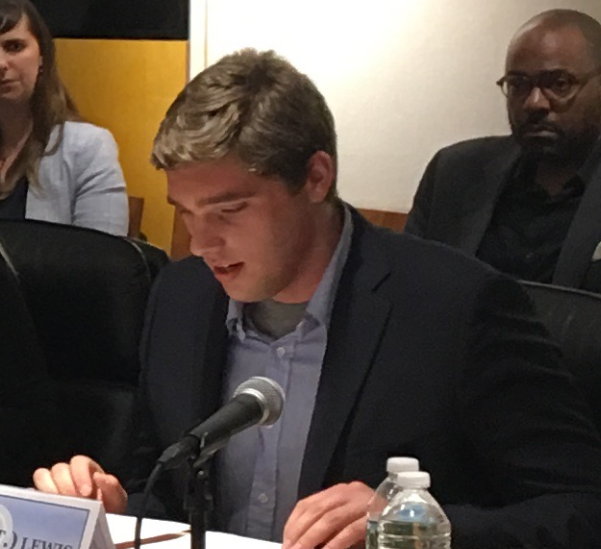
- Lewis in 2018
- Born: Joseph Theodore Lewis; May 18, 2000 (age 26)
- Education: University of Connecticut
- Occupation: Filmmaker · school safety advocate · victim rights advocate
- Years active: 2013–present
- Political party: Republican
- Parent: Scarlett Lewis (mother)

Signature
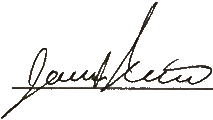

Joseph Theodore Lewis (born May 18, 2000) is an American school safety advocate. Lewis started Newtown Helps Rwanda, a charity that raised money for survivors of the 1994 Rwandan genocide as well as former child soldiers in Uganda. He previously was a candidate in the 2020 elections for Connecticut state senator for the 28th district, dropping out before the August primaries to work on a national campaign. His younger brother Jesse Lewis was a victim of the 2012 Sandy Hook Elementary School shooting in Newtown, Connecticut.

== Early life and education ==
JT Lewis was born Joseph Theodore Lewis on May 18, 2000, to Scarlett Lewis. He was in seventh grade when his six-year-old brother Jesse Lewis was killed alongside 19 other grade one students in the Sandy Hook Elementary School shooting on December 14, 2012. Lewis was raised on a farm with his younger brother and they had horses, dogs, and chickens, which their mother bought in 1998. Several days after the shooting, former president Barack Obama met with Lewis, his mother, and the victims' families at Newtown High School. Lewis recalled the event years later saying that "President Obama treated me with the utmost respect and class. More importantly, [he] honored my brother's memory." Lewis attended Newtown High School and was on the varsity football team, graduating in 2018. Lewis attended University of Connecticut as a political science major. He played on the UConn football team as a walk-on kicker his Freshman year.

== Advocacy and politics ==
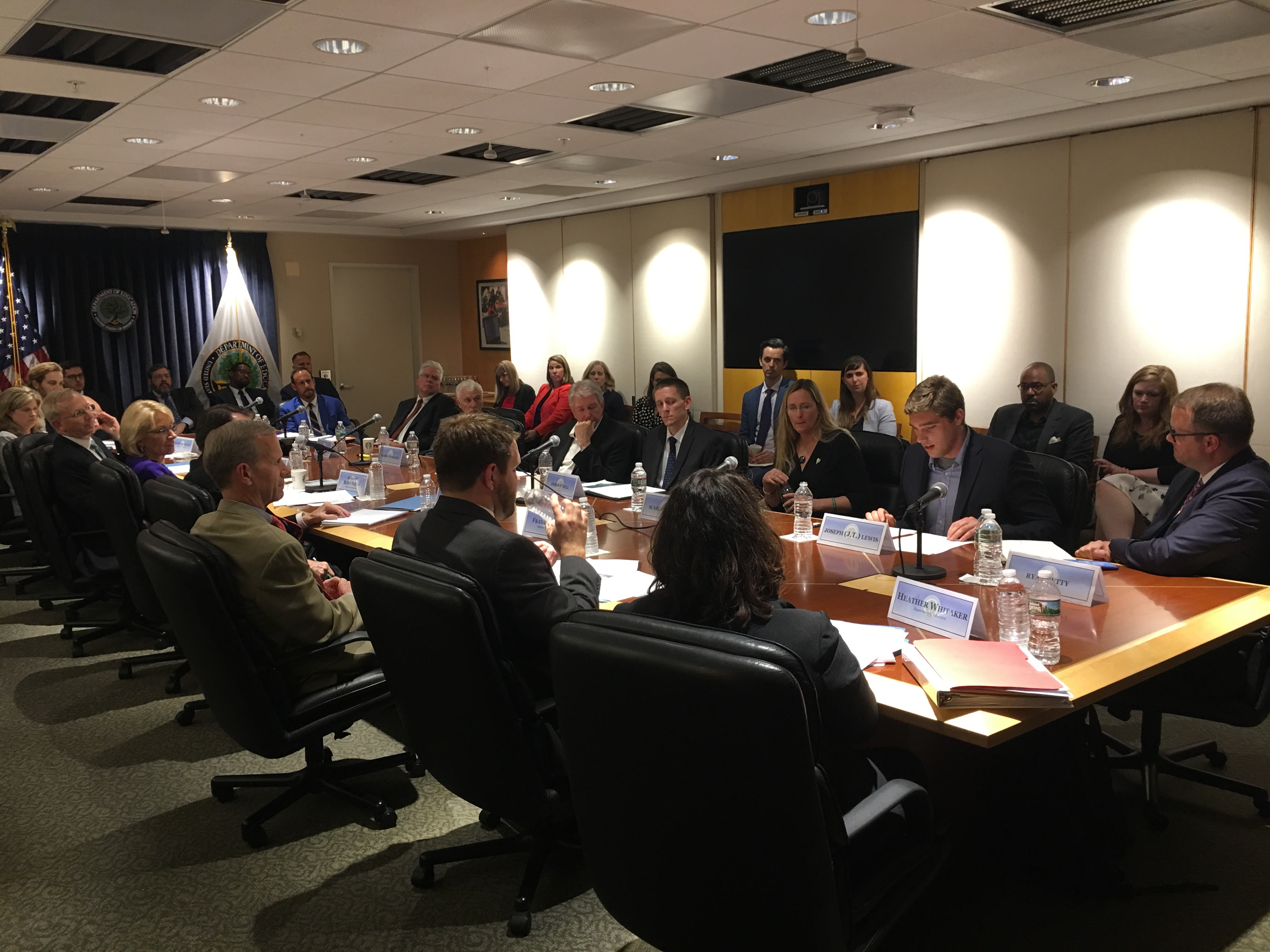
Lewis, middle row second from right, speaking to U.S. Education Secretary Betsy DeVos, in 2018.

After the shooting, Lewis became an advocate for trauma victims and founded the organization Newtown Helps Rwanda, which raises money for relatives of the victims of the 1994 Rwanda genocide to attend college and also participates in other causes. Survivors of the genocide reached out to Lewis via Skype to talk about their traumatic experiences losing family members due to violence and offer their condolences to him. As a gesture of gratitude to the survivors, Lewis founded the organization to raise money for their education. After a few months of fundraising, the organization raised enough money to send several survivors to college and have raised over $35,000. Lewis's organization also helped Ugandan former child soldiers build fishponds and poultry farms for self-sufficiency. The organization has expanded its focus to several causes to help victims of trauma, such as victims and survivors of automobile accidents. He has also interned for the non-profit organization Jesse Lewis Choose Love Movement, which his mother founded. Lewis co-won the Courage Award at the 2016 Teen Choice Awards for his advocacy work. The award was presented to him by singer Ne-Yo and actress Jessica Alba. He also met with singer Justin Timberlake after the ceremony.

Lewis met with president Donald Trump in 2018 and participated in a roundtable discussion in the Roosevelt Room on the Federal Commission on School Safety report that was published after the Stoneman Douglas High School shooting to address gun violence in American schools. He attended with his mother Scarlett and sat next to Andrew Pollack, father of Meadow Pollack, a victim of the Stoneman Douglas High School shooting, two seats away from the President. He shared his ideas about how to improve school safety with the President and other commission members. After the meeting, Lewis had a private moment with the President in the Oval Office.

After the Stoneman Douglas High School shooting in 2018, Lewis became involved in school safety reform and policy. In July 2019, Lewis announced that he was running as a Republican in the 2020 elections to represent Connecticut's 28th senate district in the Connecticut State Senate and unseat third-term incumbent senator Tony Hwang. He decided to run for public office to honor his younger brother. His campaign was centered on improving gun regulations, mental health and mental health law, and improving school safety. He has been critical of Hwang, saying that Hwang is "all about taking pictures and not taking action." Though he was running as a Republican, Lewis has expressed himself as a unifying figure and working with all lawmakers. If he won the election, he said he would still continue to attend the University of Connecticut as a state senator. He dropped out of the election in July. He announced on Instagram on July 10 that he accepted a position with President Donald Trump's 2020 campaign.

== Political views ==
Lewis is a member of the Republican Party and has said he is supportive of president Donald Trump and his administration. He supports improving national background checks on gun purchases. Commenting on his work with the Federal Commission on School Safety report, Lewis commented "It's not 100 percent perfect, but it is a great first step in the school safety movement." He also supports improving security at schools, including having armed guards at schools. Lewis has voiced support for LGBT civil rights and is a supporter of gun rights and the Second Amendment. He criticized the non-profit organization Sandy Hook Promise for using graphic images in their PSAs about school shootings.

== Personal life ==
In 2013, in response to the Sandy Hook Elementary School shooting, JT's mother Scarlett started the non-profit Jesse Lewis Choose Love Movement.

== Awards ==
- Teen Choice Awards, Courage Award, 2016.
