= Tony Wadsworth =

Tony Wadsworth may refer to:

- Tony Wadsworth (music executive), British music executive
- Tony Wadsworth (radio presenter), British radio presenter with the BBC
