= Choose Love =

Choose Love may refer to:

- Choose Love (album), a 2005 album by Ringo Starr
- Choose Love (film), a 2023 interactive romantic comedy film on Netflix
- Choose Love (organisation), a humanitarian aid organisation
- Jesse Lewis Choose Love Movement, a nonprofit organisation
- "Let's Choose Love", a 2026 single by UMFELD
