= Nancy Sullivan (English actress) =

English actress and singer (born 1985)

- Born: 1985 (age 39–40); Bermondsey, England
- Occupation: Actress

Nancy Sullivan (born 1985) is an English actress originally from South East London. She is most notably known for her role as Christine Carr in ITV's Changing Ends.

== Early life and training ==
Sullivan was born in Bermondsey where she grew up with her family, being the eldest of three children. Her father was a boxer and furniture dealer, and her mother worked in a library. She trained at the BRIT School and then continued her training at the London School of Musical Theatre. She graduated in 2004 and began to audition.

== Career ==
Her first job was working for Andrew Lloyd Webber at his Sydmonton Festival (2005), playing the role of Jenny in the world premier of The Likes Of Us, which was the first show Tim Rice and Andrew Lloyd Webber wrote together. The cast included Stephen Fry, Sally Anne Triplett, Hannah Waddingham and Michael Simkins. Sullivan can be heard on the cast recording of the show, and appeared on BBC Radio 2's Friday Night Is Music Night performing the role in concert. She then workshopped a Tony Award-winning musical, Urinetown, in which she played Little Becky (2005). Other roles she has played include Nicola in Hitting Town (2005), Cinderella in Cinderella (2005), Lisa in Footballer's Wives (2006), Lucy in Love Me Dorothy at the Edinburgh Festival Fringe (2006), and understudied Dorothy in the RSC version of The Wizard of Oz for the West Yorkshire Playhouse (2006).

She went on to create the role of Chloe for the new Take That musical, Never Forget, which completed a UK tour in 2007. Her performance can be seen on the Never Forget DVD, filmed by Universal Pictures and heard on the cast recording. In 2008, Sullivan applied for the BBC's I'd Do Anything to play the role of Nancy in Oliver!. She went through to the final stages and was one of the last 20 women before leaving the competition.

Having been noticed on the programme, she appeared in her dream role as Eponine in Les Misérables in the West End, playing the role for two years (2008-2010).

In 2013, Sullivan worked on the play Beautiful Thing at the Arts Theatre, where she was understudy to the roles of Leah and Sandra, played by actors Suranne Jones and Zaraah Abrahams. She later performed both roles. She then played the Niece in The Good Person of Szechwan, at The Colchester Mercury Theatre, and Sherbet in the 21st Anniversary Production of The Fastest Clock in the Universe, at the Old Red Lion. That production received five-star reviews and was filmed by the Victoria and Albert Museum for its National Video Archives of Performance.

== More recent activities ==
Sullivan worked on independent British films, and been involved in new writing and other stage works. Her roles include Joanne in What If Like Me (British Film 2011), Shy in The Best Little Whorehouse in Texas (Union Theatre 2011), various characters in Who's Stalking John Barrowman? (New Workshop piece 2012), Liza in Liza Liza Liza (New Workshop piece 2012), one of the Lovely Ladies in Les Misérables directed by Tom Hooper (2012), Anthea in Judy The Righteous (Trafalgar Studios and Kings Head Theatre 2012), Sandy in Smile Baby Smile (British Film 2012), and was understudy to Sandra and Leah in the play Beautiful Thing (The Arts Theatre, West Yorkshire Playhouse and Liverpool Everyman 2013).

In 2014, Sullivan returned to teaching at Rascals Theatre School in Ilford. She runs a workshop company, W1 Workshops, with David Thaxton, aimed at people wishing to further their development in the performing arts world.

In 2021, Sullivan directed ‘Our Teacher’s A Troll’.

In 2023, Sullivan starred as Christine Carr, the fictional Mum of Alan Carr, in the semi-biographic comedy Changing Ends on ITV. She later starred in series 2 in 2024 and series 3 in 2025.
