= British Phonographic Industry =

Music industry trade association in the UK

- BPI (British Recorded Music Industry) Limited
- Abbreviation: BPI
- Formation: 4 September 1973; 53 years ago
- Legal status: Nonprofit organization
- Purpose: Music industry in the United Kingdom
- Location: London
- Region served: United Kingdom
- Members: British music companies
- Chair: YolanDa Brown
- Chief executive: Sophie Jones (interim)
- Main organ: BPI Council
- Website: bpi.co.uk

BPI (British Recorded Music Industry) Limited, trading as BPI, is the British recorded music industry's trade association. It runs the BRIT Awards; is home to the Mercury Prize; co-owns the Official Charts Company with the Entertainment Retailers Association; and awards UK music sales through the BRIT Certified Awards.

== Structure ==
Its membership comprises hundreds of music companies, including (Sony Music UK, Universal Music UK, Warner Music UK), and over 500 independent record labels and small to medium-sized music businesses.

The BPI council is the management and policy forum of the BPI. It is chaired by the Chair of BPI, and includes the Chief Executive, Chief Operating Officer (COO), General Counsel, Chief Strategy Officer and 12 representatives from the recorded music sector: six from major labels – two each from the three "major" companies – and six from the independent sector, who are selected by voting of all BPI independent label members.

== History ==
The BPI has represented the interests of British record companies since being formally incorporated in 1973, when the principal aim was to promote British music and fight copyright infringement.

In 2007, the association's legal name was changed from "British Phonographic Industry Limited (The)" to "BPI (British Recorded Music Industry) Limited".

In September 2008, the BPI became one of the founding members of UK Music, an umbrella organisation representing the interests of all parts of the industry.

In July 2022, YolanDa Brown was appointed chair of BPI, replacing Ged Doherty, who had served in that role the previous seven years.

In July 2023, Jo Twist was appointed chief executive of BPI, replacing Geoff Taylor, who had served in the role since 2007.

=== Awards ===
The BPI founded the annual BRIT Awards for the British music industry in 1977, and, later, the Classic BRIT Awards. The organising company, BRIT Awards Limited, is a fully owned subsidiary of the BPI. Proceeds from both shows go to the BRIT Trust, the charitable arm of the BPI that has distributed almost £30m to charitable causes nationwide since its foundation in 1989. In September 2013, the BPI presented the first ever BRITs Icon Award to Elton John. The BPI also endorsed the launch of the Mercury Prize for the Album of the Year in 1992, and since 2016 has organised the Prize.

The recorded music industry's Certified Awards programme, which attributes Platinum, Gold and Silver status to singles, albums and music videos (Platinum and Gold only) based on their sales performance (see BRIT Certified Awards), has been administered by the BPI since its inception in 1973.

=== Grants ===
BPI coordinates funding and grants to support UK creators commercially, including by means of its Music Export Growth Scheme (MEGS). Successful applicants have included Stornoway, whose collaborative recording with Ladysmith Black Mambazo was funded by MEGS Round 24. Round 25 was announced in May 2026 for activities taking place up until 31 March 2027.

== BRIT Trust ==
The BRIT Trust is the recognised charitable arm of the BPI. It was conceived in 1989 by BPI and a collection of music industry individuals. The BRIT Trust is the only music charity actively supporting all types of music education. Proceeds from the BRIT Awards and The Music Industry Trusts Award (MITS) go to the BRIT Trust, which has donated almost £30m to charitable causes nationwide since its foundation. As of 2024, beneficiaries include The BRIT School, Nordoff and Robbins, East London Arts and Music, Music Support, and Key 4 Life.

== BRIT School ==
Opened in September 1991, the BRIT School is a joint venture between The BRIT Trust and the Department for Education and Skills (DfES). Based at Selhurst in Croydon, the comprehensive school describes itself as the leading performing and creative arts school in the UK and is completely free to attend. It teaches over 1,400 students each year aged from 14 to 19 years in music, dance, drama, musical theatre, production, media and art and design. Students are from diverse backgrounds and are not required to stick to their own discipline; dancers learn songwriting, pianists can learn photography.

In August 2023, the Department for Education approved BPI's plan to open a new specialist creative school in Bradford, West Yorkshire, inspired by the successful model of the BRIT School in Croydon.

== Certifications ==
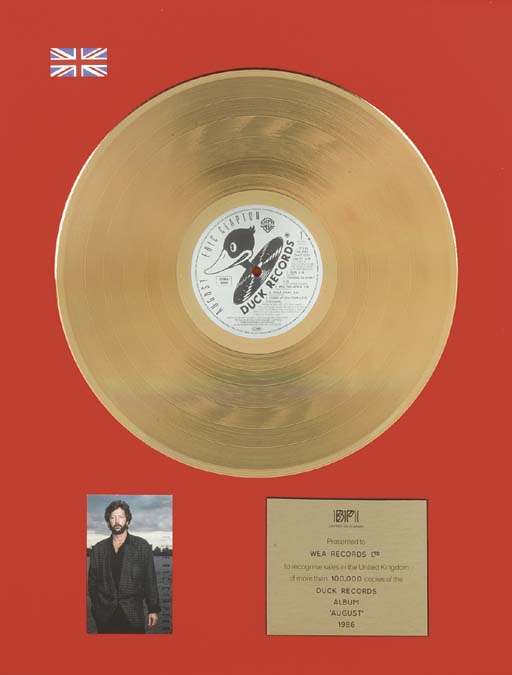
A Gold certification for Eric Clapton's album August

The BPI administers the BRIT Certified Platinum, Gold and Silver awards scheme for music releases in the United Kingdom. The level of the award varies depending on the format of the release (albums, singles or music videos) and the level of sales achieved. Although the awards programme was for many years based on the level of shipments by record labels to retailers, since July 2013 certifications have been automatically allocated by the BPI upon the relevant sales thresholds being achieved in accordance with Official Charts Company data.

Since July 2014, streaming media has been included for singles and from June 2015 audio streams were added to album certifications. In July 2018 video streams were included in singles certifications for the first time. Streaming's contributions to chart-eligible sales totals for singles and albums are calculated using the methodology employed by the Official Charts Company for consumption at title level.

In April 2018, a new Breakthrough certification was introduced, pertaining to an artist's first album to reach 30,000 sales. Additionally, the programme was re-branded as BRIT Certified, with public promotion of the programme being assumed by the BRIT Awards' social media outlets and digital properties. Former Chief Executive Geoff Taylor justified the change by stating that it was part of an effort to cross-promote the certifications with "the UK's biggest platform for artistic achievement".

In May 2023, BPI launched an expansion of the BRIT Certified Awards Scheme with BRIT Billion, which celebrates outstanding achievement in recorded music by surpassing the landmark of one billion career UK streams – as calculated by the Official Charts Company. Recipients to date include RAYE, Billie Eilish, Queen, The Rolling Stones, Olivia Rodrigo, Katy Perry, Whitney Houston, Mariah Carey, Wizkid and Coldplay. In Autumn 2023, Ed Sheeran was presented with a special edition Gold BRIT Billion Award, celebrating his achievement as the first British artist to surpass ten billion career UK streams.

Format	Status		
Format	Silver	Gold	Platinum
Album	60,000 (Note: The number of sales required to qualify for Platinum, Gold and Silver discs was changed to the current thresholds of Platinum (300,000 units), Gold (100,000 units) and Silver (60,000 units) in 1979 for albums above a minimum RRP. Below the minimum RRP, the thresholds are doubled. Prior to this, the thresholds were based on monetary revenue: Platinum (£1,000,000), Gold (£150,000 from April 1973 to September 1974, £250,000 from September 1974 to January 1977, and £300,000 from 1977 until 1979) and Silver (£75,000 from April 1973 to January 1975, £100,000 from January 1975 to January 1977, and £150,000 from 1977 until 1979).)	100,000	300,000
Single	200,000 (Note: The number of sales required to qualify for Platinum, Gold and Silver discs was dropped for singles released after 1 January 1989 to the current thresholds of Silver (200,000 units), Gold (400,000 units), and Platinum (600,000 units). Prior to this, the thresholds were Silver (250,000 units), Gold (500,000 units), and Platinum (1,000,000 units).)	400,000	600,000
Music DVD	—	25,000	50,000

== Anti-piracy operations ==
The BPI have developed bespoke software and automated crawling tools created in-house by the BPI which searches for members' repertoire across more than 400 sites known for copyright infringement, and generates URLs which are sent to Google as a DMCA notice for removal within hours of receipt. Additionally, personnel are also seconded to the City of London Police Intellectual Property Crime Unit to support anti-"piracy" operations.

== See also ==
- Home Taping Is Killing Music
- Official Charts Company
- List of music recording certifications
- Parental Advisory
