= We Are the World United =

2026 single by UMFELD

"We Are The World United"
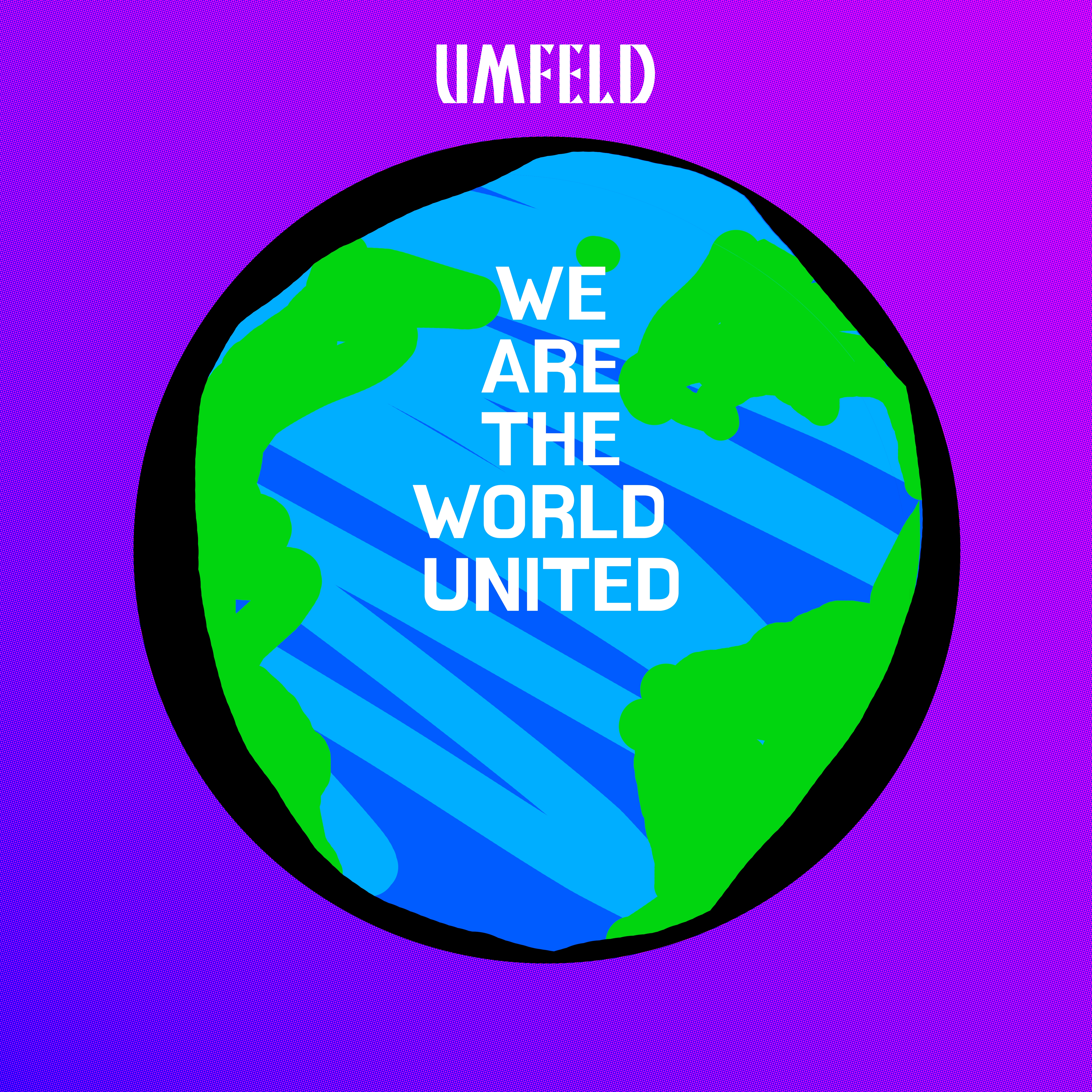

Single by UMFELD
- Released: June 5, 2026
- Recorded: May 2026
- Genre: African, Afrobeats, House, Synthpop, Downtempo, Ambient
- Length: 1:55 (Original Version); 1:49 (Percapella Version); 2:53 (World Cup Rework); 2:24 (World Cup S.P.E.D.-Up); 3:35 (Classic House Rework); 3:30 (Synthwave Rework); 3:55 (Downtempo Rework); 4:06 (Ambient Adventure)
- Label: Hilversongs
- Songwriter: Pierre Oitmann
- Producer: Pierre Oitmann

UMFELD singles chronology
"We Are The World United" (2026)	"Let's Choose Love" (2026)

Alternative cover
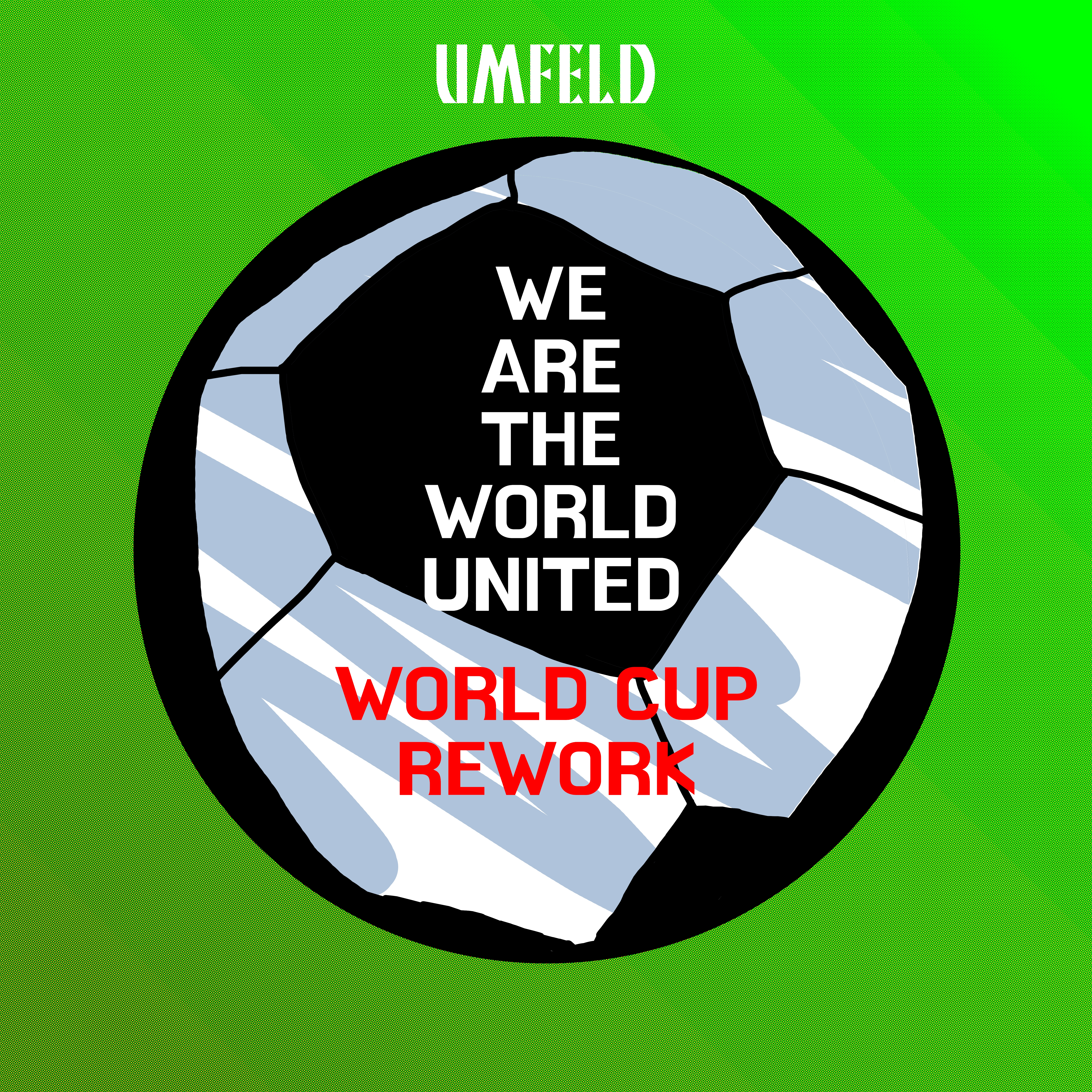
- Artwork for World Cup Rework

"We Are The World United" is a song by Dutch music project UMFELD. It was the project's debut single, originally released on June 5, 2026 by the independent label Hilversongs. It features vocals by Nigerian close harmony group RIZYN.

Besides the original version, six distinct alternate versions were issued over the course of the summer of 2026, all as 2-track singles, pairing vocal and 'dub' versions. The full vocal versions of these alternate mixes were collected on the 6-track EP We Are The World United (The Reworks), published on July 24, 2026. A week later, on July 31, six of the seven previously released dub versions were grouped on a second EP, titled We Are The World United (Summer Dubs).

== Development and release ==
"We Are The World United" was written a month prior to the song's single release by music journalist Pierre Oitmann, on May 4, 2026, the day on which The Netherlands commemorates its victims of war. Prior to that year's Remembrance Day, there was a widespread public debate about whether or not present-day refugees should be commemorated on May 4, following what some politicians dubbed a 'refugee crisis'. These debates coincided with violent riots that broke out near an asylum seekers' center in Loosdrecht in April. According to UMFELD, "We Are The World United" is a call for unity in a divided society, and directly addresses the turmoil by stating 'there's no more need for fighting'.

The World Cup Rework was released just five days after the original version, on June 10, meant to coincide with the start of the FIFA World Cup 2026. It was followed up by a batch of remixes in various other genres, each released a week apart. The Percapella Version was issued on June 19, with Sped-up versions of the World Cup Rework released on June 26, the Classic House Rework on July 3, the Synthwave Rework on July 10, and finally the Downtempo Rework on July 17, as the World Cup reached its climax. This 'waterfall' release strategy culminated in The Reworks and Summer Dubs EPs in late July.

Two of the alternate mixes were used as the B-sides to UMFELD's follow-up single, "Let's Choose Love", released in August 2026. A previously unreleased ambient remix was issued as the B-side to the single "Come Dance Through The Darkness".

=== Artwork ===
The cover image was created by Oitmann as well. It shows a heavily stylised representation of Earth with the title written across it in blocky, white lettering. The image was repurposed for the first EP release, but with a differently coloured background. Single covers for the remixes of "We Are The World United" share the same basic design, although the image of Earth is swapped for other spherical objects, like the sun or a football. The single cover for the Synthwave Rework references the logo of 80s TV show Miami Vice in its colour scheme.

== Composition ==
=== Influences ===
"We Are The World United" draws its inspiration from earlier works by Ladysmith Black Mambazo, Paul Simon, and Hans Zimmer. Following the original release, the song was remixed in various genres, mostly from the realm of electronic music.

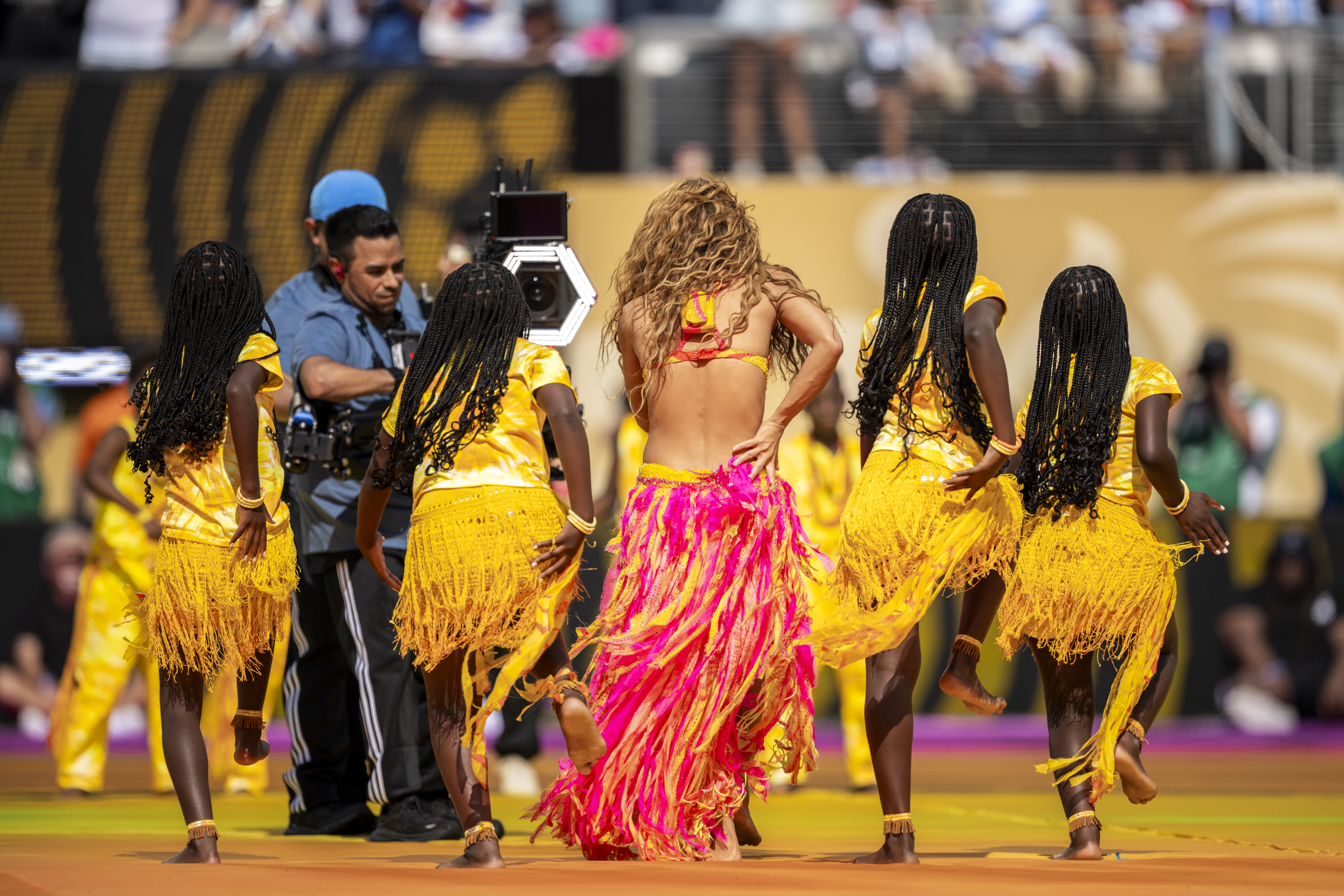
Shakira performing at the 2026 FIFA World Cup final halftime show

The World Cup Rework is an Afrobeats version with synthesized guitar parts, modern dance-pop beats, and a vocal chop. It was released four weeks after Shakira and Burna Boy's official World Cup anthem "Dai Dai", with which it shares some stylistic similarities. The World Cup S.P.E.D.-Up mix is simply a sped-up version of the World Cup Rework, aimed at social media creations on platforms like TikTok and Instagram.

The Percapella Version is a stripped-down version of the main mix, only retaining its vocals and percussion, emphasising RIZYN's chant-like singing. The term percapella was first documented forty years earlier, on the UK 12" single of "I'm Not Gonna Let You" by Colonel Abrams, released in January 1986, and in a contemporary review by James Hamilton in Record Mirror.

The Classic House Rework was inspired by Italo house from the early 1990s, incorporating a detuned electric piano, a Chicago house beat, and a 'rolling' Roland bass. The song's label, Hilversongs, compared it to classic house music hits by artists like Crystal Waters, Strike, and Black Box. The Synthwave Rework was produced in a synthpop style from the 1980s, making use of retro synthwave aesthetics.

Contrary to the other remixes, the Downtempo Rework has a much lower tempo, and is styled after chill-out music from the 2000s. While no specific artists were referenced during promotion for the song, UMFELD's Apple Music page listed Chicane and Chris Rea as inspirations, both of whom were influential to the genre.

=== Music and lyrics ===
Stylistically, the main mix is structured as a traditional hymn, with sparse instrumentation, consisting of mainly African rhythms, synthesizer chords, and a tambin flute. The vocals are provided by Emmanuel Onubuogu, Nanya Ijeh, and Samuel Osaroekiye, who are members of the Lagos-based vocal group RIZYN. Osaroekiye also provided the vocal arrangements, while Oitmann handled the production and arrangement of the backing tracks. The remixes all include elements that are characteristic for each of the respective genres, which range from traditional West African music to electronic music genres.

Lyrically, the song is built around themes of solidarity, social equality, pacifism, and environmentalism. It conveys a message of unity and harmony among people. The song lyrics touch upon spirituality by mentioning Mother Nature, while some of the wording ('the chosen ones', 'walking with the righteous') can also be interpreted in certain religious contexts. The line 'eyes of our hearts enlightened' appears to refer to Ephesians 1:18 from the New Testament, but repurposes the imagery in a secular, universal way to emphasize empathy, compassion, and global unity rather than Christian theology.

== Track listings ==
We Are The World United track listing
No.	Title	Writer(s)	Producer(s)	Length
1.	"We Are The World United"	Pierre Oitmann	Oitmann	1:55
2.	"We Are The World United (Original Dub)"	Oitmann	Oitmann	1:55

We Are The World United (World Cup Rework) track listing
No.	Title	Writer(s)	Producer(s)	Length
1.	"We Are The World United (World Cup Rework)"	Oitmann	Oitmann	2:53
2.	"We Are The World United (World Cup Dub)"	Oitmann	Oitmann	2:53

We Are The World United (Percapella Version) track listing
No.	Title	Writer(s)	Producer(s)	Length
1.	"We Are The World United (Percapella Version)"	Oitmann	Oitmann	1:49
2.	"We Are The World United (Percapella Dub)"	Oitmann	Oitmann	1:49

We Are The World United (World Cup S.P.E.D.-Up) track listing
No.	Title	Writer(s)	Producer(s)	Length
1.	"We Are The World United (World Cup S.P.E.D.-Up)"	Oitmann	Oitmann	2:24
2.	"We Are The World United (World Cup S.P.E.D.-Dub)"	Oitmann	Oitmann	2:24

We Are The World United (Classic House Rework) track listing
No.	Title	Writer(s)	Producer(s)	Length
1.	"We Are The World United (Classic House Rework)"	Oitmann	Oitmann	3:35
2.	"We Are The World United (Classic House Dub)"	Oitmann	Oitmann	3:35

We Are The World United (Synthwave Rework) track listing
No.	Title	Writer(s)	Producer(s)	Length
1.	"We Are The World United (Synthwave Rework)"	Oitmann	Oitmann	3:30
2.	"We Are The World United (Synthwave Dub)"	Oitmann	Oitmann	3:30

We Are The World United (Downtempo Rework) track listing
No.	Title	Writer(s)	Producer(s)	Length
1.	"We Are The World United (Downtempo Rework)"	Oitmann	Oitmann	3:55
2.	"We Are The World United (Downtempo Dub)"	Oitmann	Oitmann	3:55

We Are The World United (The Reworks) track listing
No.	Title	Writer(s)	Producer(s)	Length
1.	"We Are The World United (World Cup Rework)"	Oitmann	Oitmann	2:53
2.	"We Are The World United (Classic House Rework)"	Oitmann	Oitmann	3:35
3.	"We Are The World United (Synthwave Rework)"	Oitmann	Oitmann	3:30
4.	"We Are The World United (Downtempo Rework)"	Oitmann	Oitmann	3:35
5.	"We Are The World United (Percapella Version)"	Oitmann	Oitmann	1:49
6.	"We Are The World United (World Cup S.P.E.D.-Up)"	Oitmann	Oitmann	2:24

We Are The World United (Summer Dubs) track listing
No.	Title	Writer(s)	Producer(s)	Length
1.	"We Are The World United (World Cup Dub)"	Oitmann	Oitmann	2:53
2.	"We Are The World United (Classic House Dub)"	Oitmann	Oitmann	3:35
3.	"We Are The World United (Synthwave Dub)"	Oitmann	Oitmann	3:30
4.	"We Are The World United (Downtempo Dub)"	Oitmann	Oitmann	3:35
5.	"We Are The World United (Percapella Dub)"	Oitmann	Oitmann	1:49
6.	"We Are The World United (World Cup S.P.E.D.-Dub)"	Oitmann	Oitmann	2:24

== Personnel ==
Credits adapted from Spotify.

Musicians

- Pierre Oitmann – programming, gang vocals
- Samuel Osaroekiye – gang vocals
- Emmanuel Onubuogu – gang vocals
- Nanya Ijeh – gang vocals

Technical

- Pierre Oitmann – mixing engineer, mastering engineer
