= Billie Black =

British singer

- Born: 1994 or 1995 (age 30–31)
- Origin: London, England
- Genres: Electronic; jazz; soul
- Occupation: Singer
- Years active: 2014–2018
- Label: BBLK

Billie Black is a British singer from West London.

== Biography ==
Black attended the BRIT School and studied jazz at the Guildhall School of Music and Drama. She released her first single, "I Waited for You", in June 2014, to positive reviews from Complex magazine's Pigeons & Planes blog and Clash magazine. Black was profiled in Clash magazine in August 2014 and released her debut EP, 000 100, in November. Her second EP, Teach Me, was released in May 2015, and Black featured in that month's British edition of Vogue magazine. A third EP, This Simple Pleasure, followed in August.

Black describes her music as "subtle groovy tunes that make people sway" and "combining the old with new", listing jazz among her influences alongside electronic music styles including dub, minimal, and house. The Guardian wrote in September 2014 that Black "makes the kind of breathy, modern soul that sounds simultaneously welcoming and strangely unnerving", comparing her favourably to Jessie Ware.

== Discography ==
=== Extended plays ===
- 000 100 (2014)
- Teach Me (2015)
- This Simple Pleasure (2015)
