= Sidney Taurel =

American businessman

Sidney Taurel (born February 9, 1949) is a Spanish-born American businessman. He is the chairman of Pearson plc and chairman emeritus of Eli Lilly and Company, where he had a 37-year career and was chairman and chief executive officer from 1998 to 2008. He became chairman of Pearson in January 2016. He is a director of IBM and advises Almirall S.A. on corporate strategy.

== Early life and education ==
Taurel was born a Spanish national in Casablanca, French Morocco, on February 9, 1949. He received his primary and secondary education in Casablanca. In 1969, he graduated from École des Hautes Études Commerciales de Paris. In 1971, he received an MBA from Columbia Business School. He later received a doctorate in human letters honoris causa from Indiana University.

== Career ==
In 1971, Taurel joined Eli Lilly and Company's subsidiary Eli Lilly International Corporation as a marketing associate. After sales and marketing assignments in Indianapolis, São Paulo, and Paris, he became general manager of the company's affiliate in Brazil in 1981 and was appointed to the London-based position of vice president of Lilly European operations in 1983. He was named executive vice president of Eli Lilly and Company and president of its pharmaceutical division in 1993. Three years later, he was promoted to president and chief operating officer.

As chairman and CEO from 1998 to 2008, Taurel led the company's efforts to successfully tackle the challenge of the patent loss of its main product Prozac while remaining independent; he drove a deeper globalization of the company, significantly increased its commitment to research and development and partnering, and oversaw the successful launches of a dozen new products, roughly doubling the company's sales. He spoke often on behalf of the pharmaceutical industry, as chairman of Pharmaceutical Research and Manufacturers of America from 1998 to 1999.

== Accolades ==
A U.S. citizen since 1995, Sidney received the 2000 Ellis Island Medal of Honor from the National Ethnic Coalition of Organizations. Also in 2001, the Anti-Defamation League honored Taurel with its American Heritage Award.

In 2002, was named by U.S. President George W. Bush as a Homeland Security Advisory Council member. In 2003, Bush named Taurel a member of the President's Export Council. In April 2007, he was appointed to the Advisory Committee for Trade Policy and Negotiations by President Bush. He is an officer of the French Legion of Honor.

Taurel is a past president of the Pharmaceutical Research and Manufacturers of America (PhRMA). He is a member of The Business Council, and a past member of the Business Roundtable, as well as of the boards of ITT Industries, McGraw-Hill Companies, and the RCA Tennis Championships. He is also a member of the board of overseers of Columbia Business School and a trustee at Indianapolis Museum of Art.

In October 2015, Taurel was appointed as chairman of Pearson plc, the British multinational publishing and education company headquartered in London.

== Personal life ==
In 1977, Taurel married Kathryn H Fleischmann from São Paulo, Brazil. They had three children, Alex (born in Paris in 1979), Patrick (born in 1982 in São Paulo), and Olivia (born in 1988 in Indianapolis). They became American citizens in 1995. His wife Kathryn died in 2014.
