= HMS Holdings =

HMS Holdings Corp.
- Company type: Private
- Industry: Business services
- Founded: 1974; 52 years ago
- Headquarters: Irving, Texas, U.S.
- Key people: William C. Lucia (FLMI) (CEO, president, and Director)
- Services: Cost-containment services
- Revenue: US$ 598.3M (Feb 22, 2019)
- Owner: Veritas Capital
- Number of employees: 2,425 (Sep 30, 2013)
- Website: www.hms.com

HMS Holdings Corp. (Health Management Systems) was founded in 1974 and is based in Irving, Texas. The company was formerly listed on Nasdaq but acquired by private-equity firm Veritas Capital in 2021.

== History ==
HMS Holdings was acquired by Gainwell Technologies in 2021 for a reported $3.4 billion.

== Products and services ==
The company's services include providing validated insurance and helping find liable third parties. Their program integrity services identify improper payments and over-payments and attempt recovery, as well as reduce fraud and waste. In addition, the company also supports Medicaid Managed Care Organizations and Medicare Advantage Plans.

== Acquisitions ==
In 2006, the company announced to acquire the assets of PCG's Benefits Solutions Practice Area (BSPA) for $80 million in cash, shares of Holdings common stock, and a contingent cash payment of up to $15 million.

The company acquired HealthDataInsights for approximately $400 million in November 2011. In December 2012, HMS Holdings acquired the assets and liabilities of MedRecovery Management, LLC (MRM), for about $11.8 million, with $10.8 million initial cash payment and $1.0 million in future contingent payments.

In April 2017, HMS Holdings acquired the Eliza Corporation, a privately held health engagement management and member analytics firm providing comprehensive and personalized member-centric outreach and engagement solutions, for a cash purchase price of $170 million.

In March 2017, Eliza Corporation, a SaaS health engagement platform, was acquired for $170 million. In September 2016, the company purchased Essette.

In 2019, the company acquired Accent for a reported $155 million.

== Awards ==
In 2012 and 2013, HMS Holdings was included in the InformationWeek 500.
In 2013, HMS Holdings was included on Modern Healthcare magazine's "Healthcare’s Hottest" list as one of the 40 fastest growing companies in healthcare.
