= Scarlett Lewis =

American activist

- Lewis in 2016
- Born: 1967 or 1968 (age 58–59)
- Occupation: Founder Jesse Lewis Choose Love Movement
- Children: 2, including JT Lewis

Scarlett Lewis is an American activist, educator, and author who founded the non-profit Jesse Lewis Choose Love Movement after her son Jesse was murdered during the Sandy Hook Elementary School shooting.

== Death of Jesse Lewis ==
On December 14, 2012, Lewis' youngest son Jesse was murdered during the Sandy Hook Elementary School shooting, causing Lewis to become an advocate for Character Social-Emotional Development (CSED) programs. On January 29, 2013, she founded the Jesse Lewis Choose Love Movement to provide Character Social Emotional Development programs to schools and other organizations free of cost.

== Activism ==
Lewis explained her motivation for founding the Jesse Lewis Choose Love Movement in a 2018 interview with The Atlantic, saying, “I think the reason that we haven’t been able to solve the school-safety crisis is because we are not thinking in terms of actual solutions. The vast majority of solutions being discussed are not addressing the cause; they’re addressing the effect. The cause of what we’re seeing is anger, disconnection, isolation, lack of resilience, lack of ability to manage emotions.”

Lewis has helped develop and promote her non-profit's programming to be provided for free to parents and educators. Their programs are now taught in over 10,000 schools, in all 50 states and in over 120 countries, serving over 3 million children annually. Lewis has explained that the fundamental basis for their programming spawned from a message Jesse had left on a chalkboard at their home that phonetically spelled out the words of: Nurturing, Healing, Love.

Lewis's non-profit provides programming that can help educators and students "to choose love, handle adversity, and manage their emotions". Their programming is also extended into homes, communities, athletics, and the workplace. Lewis is often asked by press to weigh in on topics of school shootings and their root causes.

== Books ==
Lewis is the author of Nurturing Healing Love: A Mother’s Journey of Hope & Forgiveness, a memoir of her journey toward choosing love and forgiveness; From Sandy Hook to the World: How the Choose Love Movement Transforms Lives, an in-depth explanation at how Lewis founded the Jesse Lewis Choose Love Movement and its impact around the world today; and Rose’s Foal, a children's book that tells the story of a horse and her newborn foal.

== Recognition ==
Lewis was a 2021 Forbes "50 Over 50 Impact" honoree.

== Published works ==
- Rose’s Foal (BookSurge, 2009)
- Nurturing Healing Love: A Mother’s Journey of Hope and Forgiveness (Hay House, 2014)
- From Sandy Hook to the World: How the Choose Love Movement Transforms Lives: Stories from Around the Globe (Independent, 2021)
