= Healthcare Leadership Council =

American group of healthcare CEOs

- Location: Washington D.C., United States
- Members: health insurance companies; pharmaceutical companies; medical device manufacturers; pharmacy chains; hospitals
- Chief Executive Officer: Maria Ghazal

Healthcare Leadership Council is an organization of Chief Executive Officers from several companies and organizations associated with the health care field in the United States. Membership includes heads of health insurance companies, pharmaceutical companies, medical device manufacturers, pharmacy chains, hospitals, and others. The organization's website describes it as "a coalition of chief executives from all disciplines within American healthcare" and a "forum ... to jointly develop policies, plans, and programs to achieve their vision of a 21st century system that makes affordable, high-quality care accessible to all Americans."

Healthcare Leadership Council is a listed member of a Washington PR firm called Partnership for America’s Health Care Future.

As of May 2025, the organization is led by chief executive officer Maria Ghazal.

Key Member Organizations (As of 2026):

- Providers/Systems: AdventHealth, Ascension, Mayo Clinic, MemorialCare, Mount Sinai Health System, Texas Health Resources
- Pharmaceutical/Biotech: Amgen, AstraZeneca
- Technology & Service Providers: Amazon, ConnectiveRx, Epic Systems, Oracle Health/Life Sciences, Premier Inc., Surescripts
- Other: Baxter, Cencora, ComPsych

Leadership Team:

- Maria Ghazal: President and CEO
- Sean Brown: Vice President of Communications
- David Wiermanski: Vice President of Finance and Administration
- Corey Miller: Associate Vice President of Government Affairs
- Clara Keane: Director of Policy
