= Federal Commission on School Safety =

2018 U.S. presidential commission

History
- Established by: Donald Trump on March 12, 2018

Membership
- Chairperson: Betsy DeVos
- Other committee members: Jeff Sessions; Matthew Whitaker; Alex Azar; Kirstjen Nielsen

Jurisdiction
- Purpose: To review safety practices and make meaningful and actionable recommendations of best practices to keep students safe.
- Policy areas: Education, Law, Homeland Security

The Federal Commission on School Safety or School Safety Commission is a council of members of the Cabinet of the United States formed in March 2018, in the wake of the Stoneman Douglas High School shooting the previous month, to address gun violence in schools.

== Background ==
In March 2018, U.S. Secretary of Education Betsy DeVos was appointed head of the Federal Commission on School Safety by President Donald Trump. The purpose of the commission was to improve student safety at school by providing plans and recommendations of action designed to meet specific needs, including a range of issues from social-emotional support, school safety infrastructure, and the impacts video games and broadcast media have on violence. Commission members as of 2018 included Voss, Attorney General Jeff Sessions (and later former Acting Attorney General Matthew Whitaker), Secretary of Health and Human Services Alex Azar, and Secretary of Homeland Security Kirstjen Nielsen. Formal meetings were hosted by the commission as were field visits for the purpose of gathering input from experts on relevant subjects. The public also provided input on ways to make schools safer.

== Plan of action ==
The commission reported that there could not be a one-plan-fits-all because of the many variations in schools across the country; therefore, the commission's focus while drafting their final recommendations was on school size, structure, and geographic location. The Commission considered input from their meetings as well as field visits and information they acquired from listening sessions. Other considerations critical to their work include input from parents and students, teachers, school administrators, counselors, safety personnel, law enforcement and security professionals, mental health professionals, and other related independent parties. The Commission noted in their report: "Implementation of the practices identified in this guide is purely voluntary, and no federal agency will take any action against schools that do not adopt them".

== 2018 Report ==
On December 18, 2018, the Commission released its final report consisting of 177 pages "detailing 93 best practices and policy recommendations for improving safety at schools across the country". The report is wide-ranging with coverage that includes cyber bullying and social and the emotional well-being of students, to improvements in building security. These recommendations were based on current efforts that were working in various states. The report "emphasizes the critical need for healthy relationships, caring school communities, and an interconnected citizenry as the main defenses against school violence".

Among the policy recommendations were proposals for "rescinding an Obama-era initiative meant to reduce racial disparities in school discipline", which the Commission asserted "has made schools less safe by discouraging them from removing dangerous students". Recommended steps include "threat assessment programs, security improvements, and active shooter drills". The Report was criticized by Democrats, civil rights advocates and gun control activists, who expressed a preference for more stringent gun control laws in response to school violence.
