= BRIT School =

British school for performing arts and technology

The BRIT School Limited

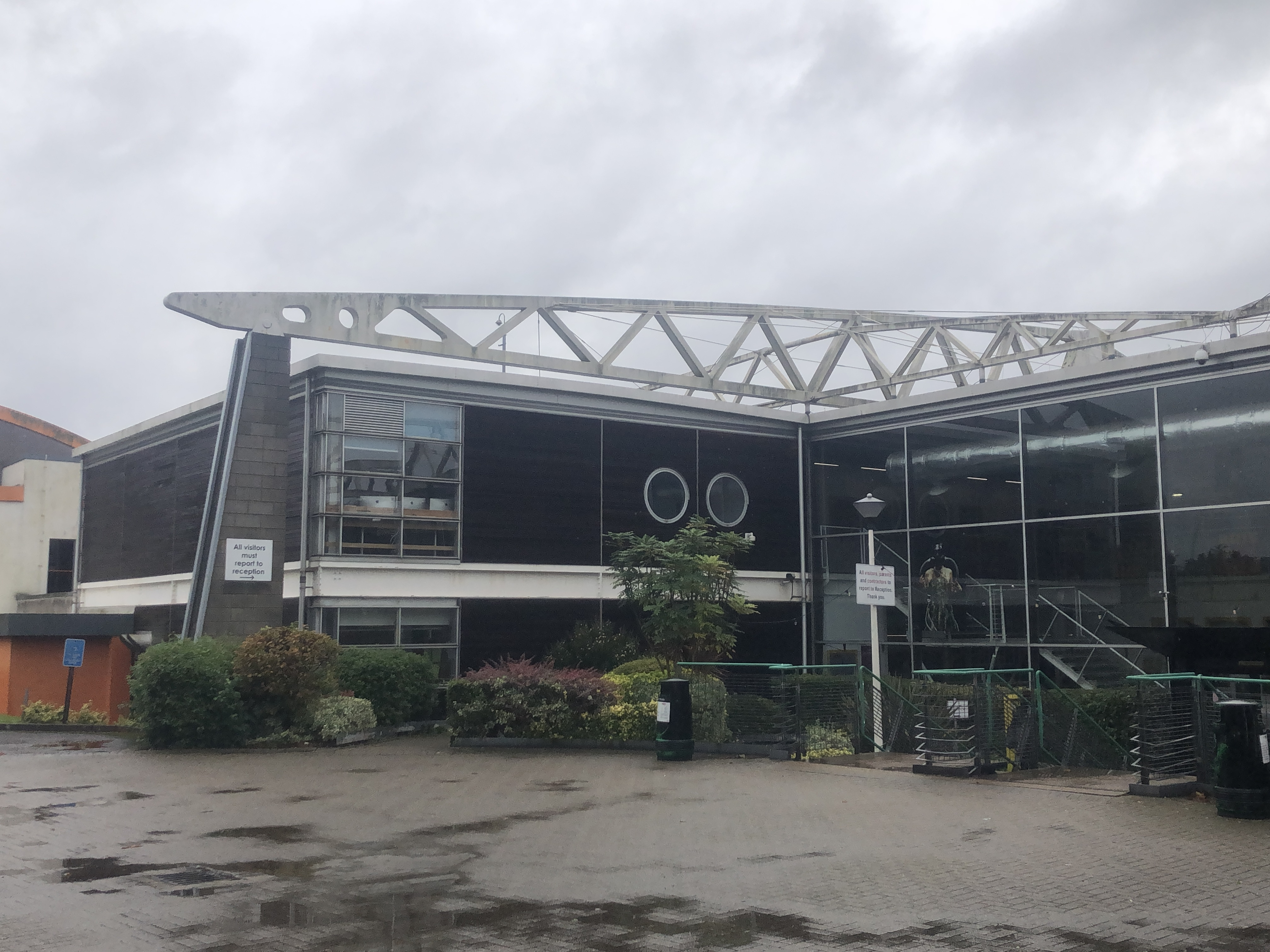

Location
- The Crescent; Croydon, CR0 2HN; England; 51.3899°N 0.0914°W

Information
- Other name: The BRIT School for Performing Arts and Technology
- Type: City Technology College
- Established: 22 October 1991; 35 years ago
- Local authority: London Borough of Croydon
- Trust: BRIT Trust
- Department for Education URN: 101849 Tables
- Ofsted: Reports
- Chairman: Josh Berger
- Principal: Stuart Worden
- Staff: ~170
- Years taught: Year 10 - Year 13/14 (theatre)
- Gender: Mixed
- Age: 14 to 19
- Enrollment: 1419
- Website: brit.croydon.sch.uk

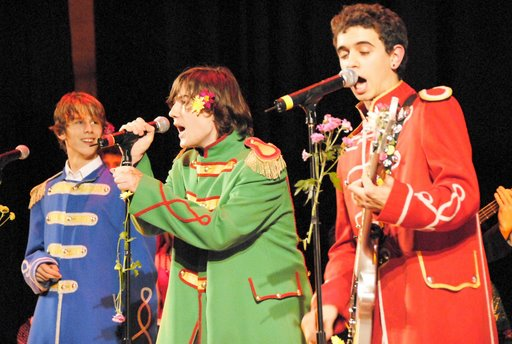
Beatles Gig (Music)

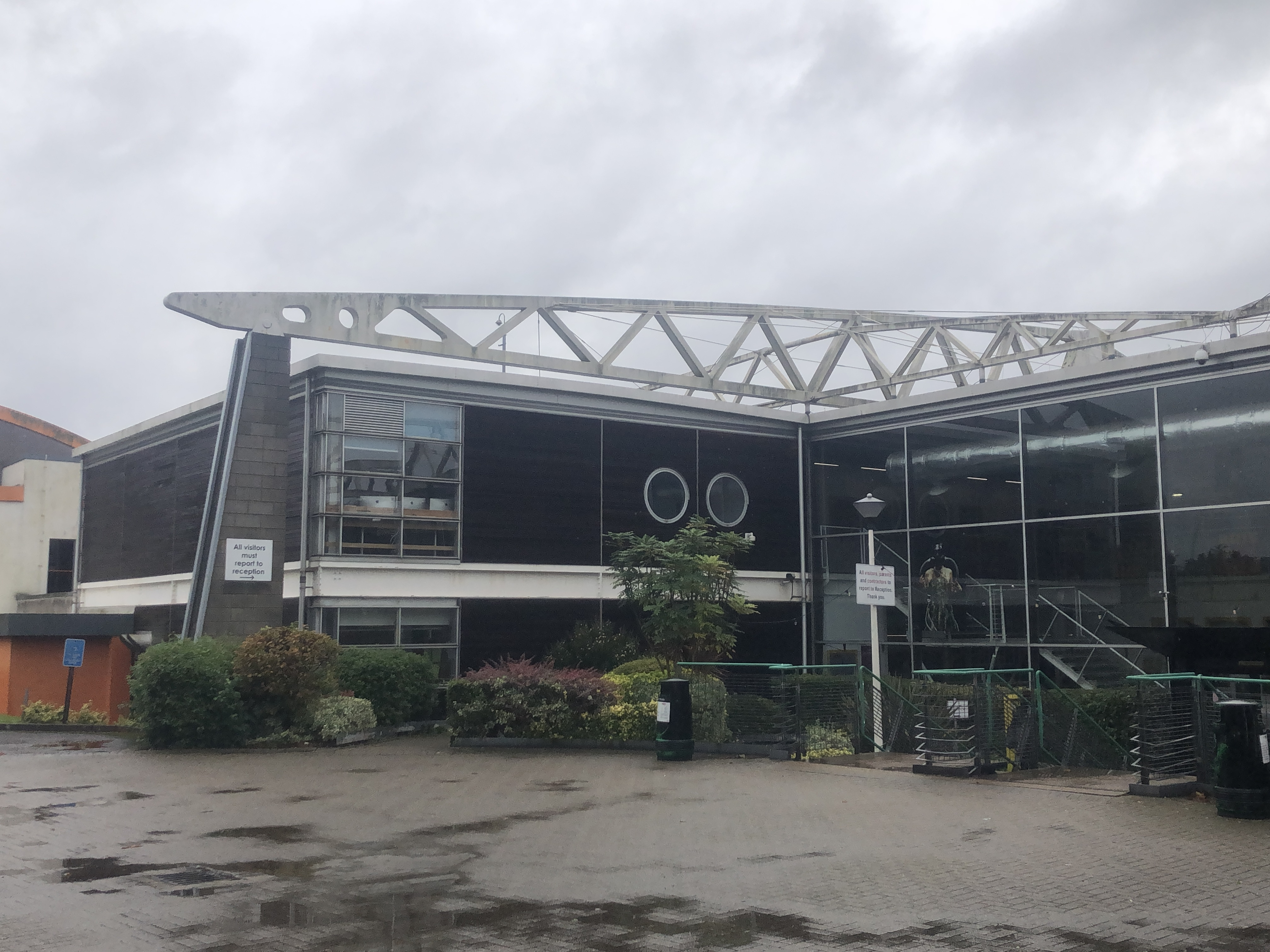
The BRIT School in 2024

Dance Vision (Dance)

Steer The Stars (Musical Theatre)

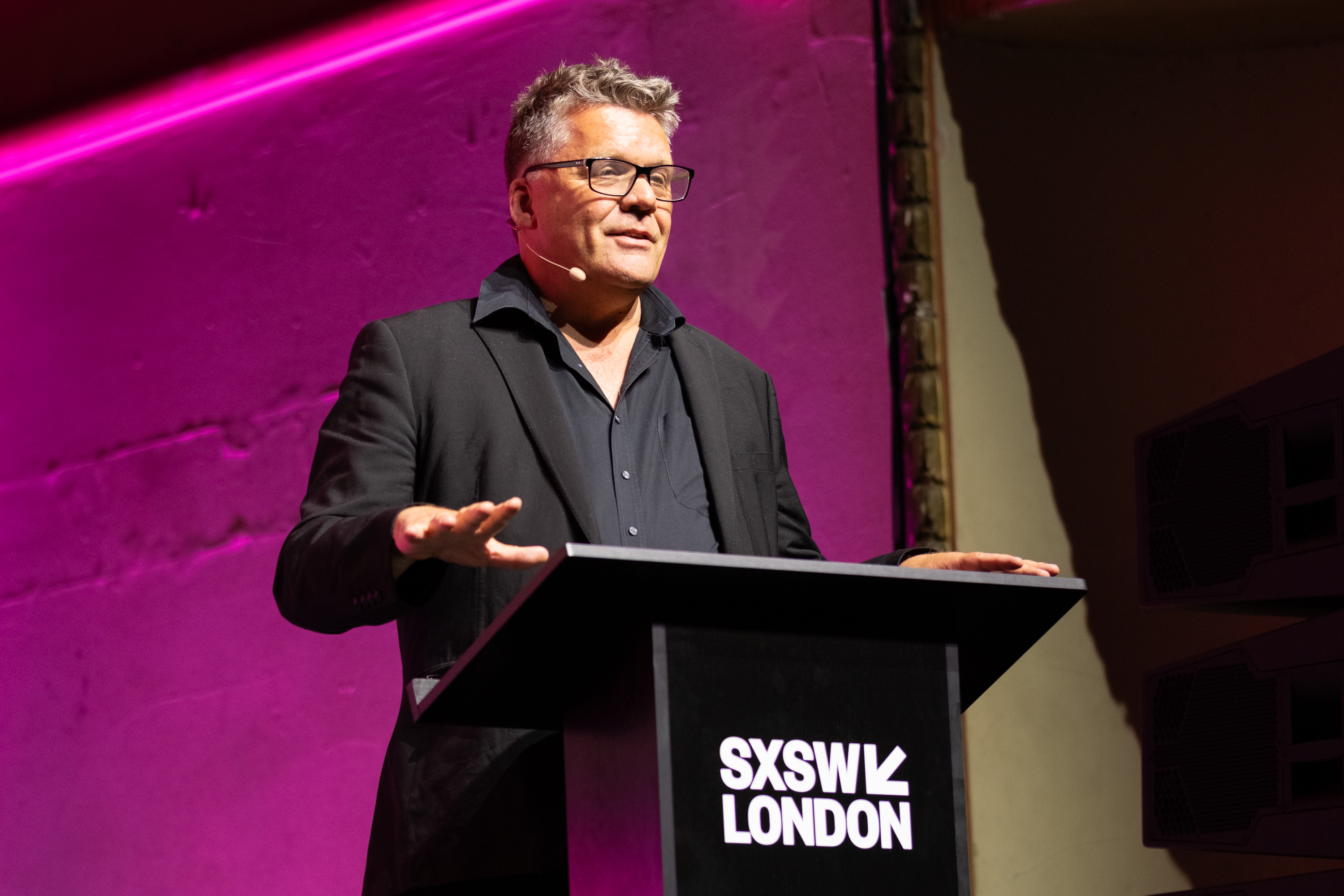
Stuart Worden, Principal of the BRIT School, at the SXSW London festival hosted in London, England during June 2025

The London School for Performing Arts & Technology, more commonly referred to as The BRIT School, is a secondary school in Selhurst, Croydon, England, specializing in the performing and creative arts. The school is free-to-attend.

The school opened on 22 October 1991 under the City Technology College programme and is separate from the local education authority. The Department for Education provides 71% of the school's funding and the remainder comes from fundraising and commercial income, including contributions by the British Record Industry Trust (BRIT Trust) and proceeds from broadcasting rights to the annual Brit Awards. About 90% of its students are from London.

The school has two professional theatres, the Obie Theatre, which can seat audiences of up to 324 and standing audiences up to 500; and the BRIT Theatre, which opened in January 2012 and seats audiences of up to 280. There are also various dance studios, musical theatre studios, and TV and radio studios.

== History ==
The BRIT School was founded by Mark Featherstone-Witty, who was inspired by Alan Parker's 1980s film Fame to create a secondary school specialising in the performing arts to help students enter the industry, which at that time had many barriers.

He asked Sir Richard Branson to fund the school; Branson agreed on the condition that other record companies also contributed. Funding was received from the British Phonographic Industry.

George Martin helped design its recording studio.

The school was also supported by Margaret Thatcher's City Technology College initiative.

In June 1990, the Knebworth Festival, organized by Richard Branson, raised £2.5 million for the school with a festival attended by 120,000 people that featured performances by Pink Floyd, Paul McCartney, Phil Collins, Genesis, Eric Clapton, Dire Straits, Elton John, Robert Plant, Jimmy Page, Cliff Richard, and Tears for Fears.

Elizabeth II visited the school in 2002.

In 2012, in a £5 million expansion, the school acquired and renovated part of the adjacent former Selhurst High School building. Three new courses, Production Arts, Interactive Digital Design (now known as Digital Arts) and Community Arts Practise (now Applied Theatre) were introduced.

Former principal Sir Nick Williams was knighted in the 2013 New Year Honours for services to education.

By 2017, alumni of the school had sold a combined 125 million albums.

YouTube Music funded a Television Studio that opened in 2019 for Film & Media Production students. This was in response to the student-run show "The BRIT Live" which airs on the BRIT School's YouTube channel, giving the students their own studio and control room for broadcasting.

In 2022, the school was awarded a PRS for Music heritage award for shaping UK Art and culture for 30 years.

== Entry requirements ==
Entry to any of the school's courses is initially by application. If applicants meet the initial entry criteria, they may then be invited to interview or workshop in their chosen focus (strand) (either film and media production (FMP), Applied Theatre, dance, digital arts, music, music technology, musical theatre, production arts, theatre, or visual arts & design), for sixth-form entry students, plus a meeting with relevant tutors. Entry to the music course also includes aural and music theory tests and an audition, with entry to the dance, theatre, visual art & design, and musical theatre courses also including audition rounds. The school is known for being selective in its admissions and though it has a large catchment area, students outside this area are granted a place only if they show unusual merit.

An article by BBC News published in 2011 discussed whether students who are accepted by the school get an unfair advantage in creative arts industries over those who did not.

== Curriculum ==
Even though most students intend to make a career in the arts, entertainment and communications industries, they must follow full-time courses to completion.

The school teaches the following courses:

Strand/Course	Int.	KS4	Post-16	Year 14	Notes
Creative Arts
Film & Media Production	FMP	✓	✓		formerly 'Media, Art & Design' and 'Broadcast and Digital Communication'
Digital Arts	DA	✓	✓		formerly 'Interactive Digital Design' Graphic Design, Illustration, Animation, 3D Art, Typography
Visual Arts & Design	VAD	✓	✓		split into Fashion, Styling and Textiles
Production Arts	PA		✓		formerly 'Production Arts & Technology' and 'Technical Theatre Arts'
Performing Arts
Theatre		✓	✓	✓	year 14 students are required to be internal post-16 students to apply
Music		✓	✓		
Music Technology			✓		
Musical Theatre	MT	✓	✓		
Dance		✓	✓		
Applied Theatre	AT		✓		formerly 'Community Arts Practice' (changed 2022)

== Notable alumni ==
Notable alumni include:

- Ace and Vis (TV/radio presenters)
- Adele (singer-songwriter)
- Amy Winehouse (singer-songwriter)
- Ashley Madekwe (actor)
- Archie Madekwe (actor)
- Bashy (rapper/actor)
- Billie Black (singer)
- Black Midi (band)
- Blake Harrison (actor)
- Breakage (musician)
- Cat Burns (singer)
- Cash Carraway (screenwriter/showrunner)
- Cat Sandion (presenter)
- Charlene Soraia (singer)
- Cush Jumbo (actor)
- Dan Gillespie Sells of the band The Feeling
- Dane Bowers (singer-songwriter and former member of Another Level)
- Deelee Dubé (jazz vocalist, songwriter, and poet)
- Eden Hunter (singer-songwriter)
- Ella Eyre (singer-songwriter)
- Eman Kellam (presenter)
- Emily Head (actor)
- FKA Twigs (singer-songwriter and dancer)
- Freya Ridings (singer)
- Gemma Cairney (radio presenter)
- Geordie Greep (musician)
- Gracie McGonigal (actress)
- Harrison Osterfield (actor and model)
- Imogen Heap (singer)
- Jade Bird (singer)
- Jamie Isaac (singer-songwriter)
- Jamie Woon (singer)
- Jessica Morgan (singer)
- Jessie J (singer-songwriter)
- Joel Pott (singer/frontman of Athlete)
- Joivan Wade (actor)
- Jvck James (singer-songwriter)
- Kae Tempest (spoken word performer, poet, recording artist, novelist and playwright)
- Kate Nash (singer-songwriter)
- Karis Anderson (singer and member of Stooshe)
- Katie Melua (singer-songwriter)
- Katy B (singer-songwriter)
- Kellie Shirley (actor)
- King Krule (singer)
- Laura Angela Collins (poet, producer, author)
- Laura Dockrill (poet, author and illustrator)
- Leona Lewis (singer-songwriter)
- Lola Young (singer-songwriter)
- Benjamin Coyle-Larner (rapper, under the stage name Loyle Carner)
- Luke Pritchard (singer)
- Lynden David Hall (singer)
- Marsha Ambrosius (singer-songwriter and member of Floetry)
- Maya Delilah (singer and guitarist)
- Nancy Sullivan (actress)
- Natalie Stewart (singer and member of Floetry)
- Nathan Stewart-Jarrett (actor)
- Octavian (rapper)
- Olivia Dean (singer)
- Percelle Ascott (actor)
- Polly Scattergood (singer)
- Rachel Chinouriri (singer)
- Raine Allen-Miller (film director)
- RAYE (singer-songwriter)
- Rex Orange County (singer-songwriter/producer)
- Rhianne Barreto (actress)
- Richard Jones of the band The Feeling
- Rickie Haywood Williams (presenter, Kiss FM)
- Rizzle Kicks (hip hop duo)
- Robert Emms (actor)
- Róisín Mullins, (dancer and presenter)
- Shawn Emanuel (singer)
- Shelby Logan Warne (singer and multi-instrumentalist)
- Shingai Shoniwa of the band Noisettes (singer)
- Stuart Matthew Price (singer)
- Tania Foster (singer)
- Talia Mar (singer and Internet personality)
- Tara McDonald (singer)
- Tom Holland (actor)
- Twist and Pulse (performers)
- Will Bayley (Paralympian)
