= Eden Hunter =

English singer, songwriter and model

- Born: Eden Hunt-Turner; 7 May 2001 (age 25)
- Origin: London, England
- Genre: Pop
- Occupations: Singer; songwriter; model
- Years active: 2001–present
- Label: I
- Website: edenhunter.co.uk

Eden Hunt-Turner (born 7 May 2001), known professionally as Eden Hunter, is an English singer, songwriter, and model.

== Career ==
Eden Hunter is a BRIT School graduate. Her self-penned debut single "Weightless", released on October 20, 2021, was co-written and produced by Nick Hahn.

Hunter was named Mighty Hoopla's Emerging Artist of the Year in 2022, sold out a headlining concert in Hoxton, and performed on the Leicester Square Stage at London Pride in 2023. She was the opening act during concerts for major label artists such as Tom Grennan, Ella Eyre, Thomas Headon, Britain's Got Talent finalist James Smith, and Anna of the North.

In May 2025, Hunter appeared on the charity single "Your Light Will Shine", dedicated to the late RuPaul's Drag Race UK winner The Vivienne, and performed it live at that year's Attitude Awards.

Her debut EP The Circus Man was released on March 13, 2026.

== Discography ==
=== Singles ===
- "Weightless" (2021)
- "Chance My Heart" (2021)
- "All My Love" (2021)
- "Twenty" (2022)
- "Knock Me Out" (2025)

=== EPs ===
- The Circus Man (2026)
