= Tony Wadsworth (music executive) =

British record executive

Tony Wadsworth CBE
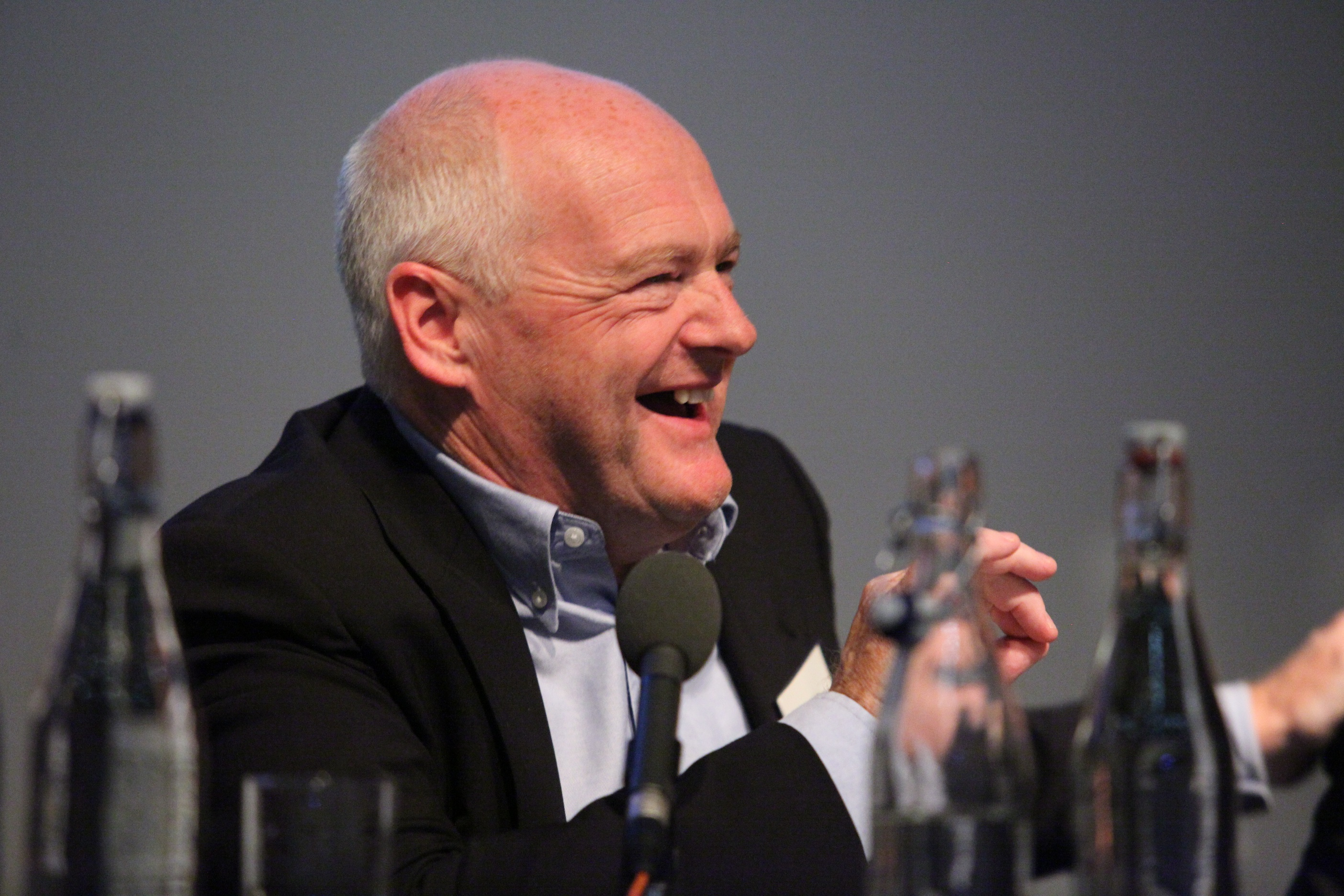
- Wadsworth in 2009

Background information
- Occupation: Music executive
- Years active: 1982–present
- Labels: RCA, Parlophone, EMI Records

Tony Wadsworth CBE is a British music executive.

== Biography ==
Having graduated in Economics at Newcastle University in 1977, Wadsworth spent the next two years playing guitar in a new wave band, before working in a succession of small record labels, culminating in a short period at RCA, followed by his arrival in 1982 at EMI Records.

He relaunched Parlophone in the early 1990s, and as the label's managing director, was involved with Radiohead, Blur, Pet Shop Boys, Foo Fighters, Queen, Tina Turner and Paul McCartney.

In 1998, he was promoted to the role of Chairman & CEO EMI Music UK, leading all of the company's UK labels, including Capitol, EMI, Virgin, Chrysalis and Parlophone, as well as the company's recording studios Olympic, Townhouse and the Abbey Road Studios. During this time, he worked with artists such as Robbie Williams, Coldplay, Kylie Minogue, Lily Allen, Norah Jones, Gorillaz, the Rolling Stones and the Beatles, among others.

In 2008, after 26 years at EMI and 10 years leading the company, he stepped down soon after its acquisition by a private equity company.

Wadsworth became a Council member of the industry trade association, the BPI, in 1998, and was Chairman of the Brits annual awards show for three years from 2000–2002, during which time he established the Brits independent TV production company Brits TV. From 2007 to 2014, he held the posts of Chairman of the BPI and Chairman of Brit Awards Ltd.

Wadsworth continues to serve as a Trustee of the Brit Trust and as a Governor of the Brit School. He also holds the post of visiting professor in the music and business schools of the University of Newcastle upon Tyne.

He is also Chairman of the charity Julie's Bicycle and a Trustee of the EMI Music Sound Foundation and the EMI Archive Trust.

He is a non-executive board director of BIMM and additionally has commercial interests ranging from ethical ticketing to a vinyl record store.

== Awards ==
Wadsworth has an Honorary Doctorate in Music from the University of Gloucestershire.

In March 2008, he was awarded the Music Week Strat award for outstanding contribution to the UK music industry.

In 2009, he was awarded the Scott Piering Award by the Radio Academy to recognize outstanding contribution to music radio.

In June 2011, he was appointed a CBE in the Queen's Birthday Honours List for his services to the UK music industry.
