= Key4Life =

British charity

Key 4 Life
- Formation: 2013
- Type: Charity
- Purpose: Supporting current and ex offenders
- Headquarters: Somerset
- Region served: United Kingdom
- Official language: English
- Chief executive officer: Eva Hamilton MBE
- Website: www.key4life.org.uk//

Key4Life is a British charity launched on 14 June 2013 to help reduce youth reoffending through the delivery of a rehabilitation programme to those in prison and those at risk of going to prison. Jonathan Joseph and Anthony Watson, the England and Bath Rugby players, have pledged their support to Key4Life, the young offender rehabilitation charity. The charity tries to assist young men in prison who may be having difficulty in not returning to a life of crime and becoming some growing statics of reoffending youth in the UK. A year later, of the 23 young adults that Key4Life had worked with, 8% have reoffended which is much better than the national average of 74%.

== Results and Research ==
116 young men have been through the Key4Life programme at HM Prison Ashfield, HM Prison Isis, HM Prison Portland, HM Prison Wormwood Scrubs and Somerset Preventative 'At Risk' programmes.

2017 programmes include a 'At Risk' programme in London, a further programme at HMP/YOI Portland and the first-ever residential programme at HMP Guys Marsh

145 mentors trained and provided support to young men pre- and post-release

80 businesses involved in providing Work Tasters, workshops and employment.
