= Jesse Lewis Choose Love Movement =

Non-profit organization founded in the United States

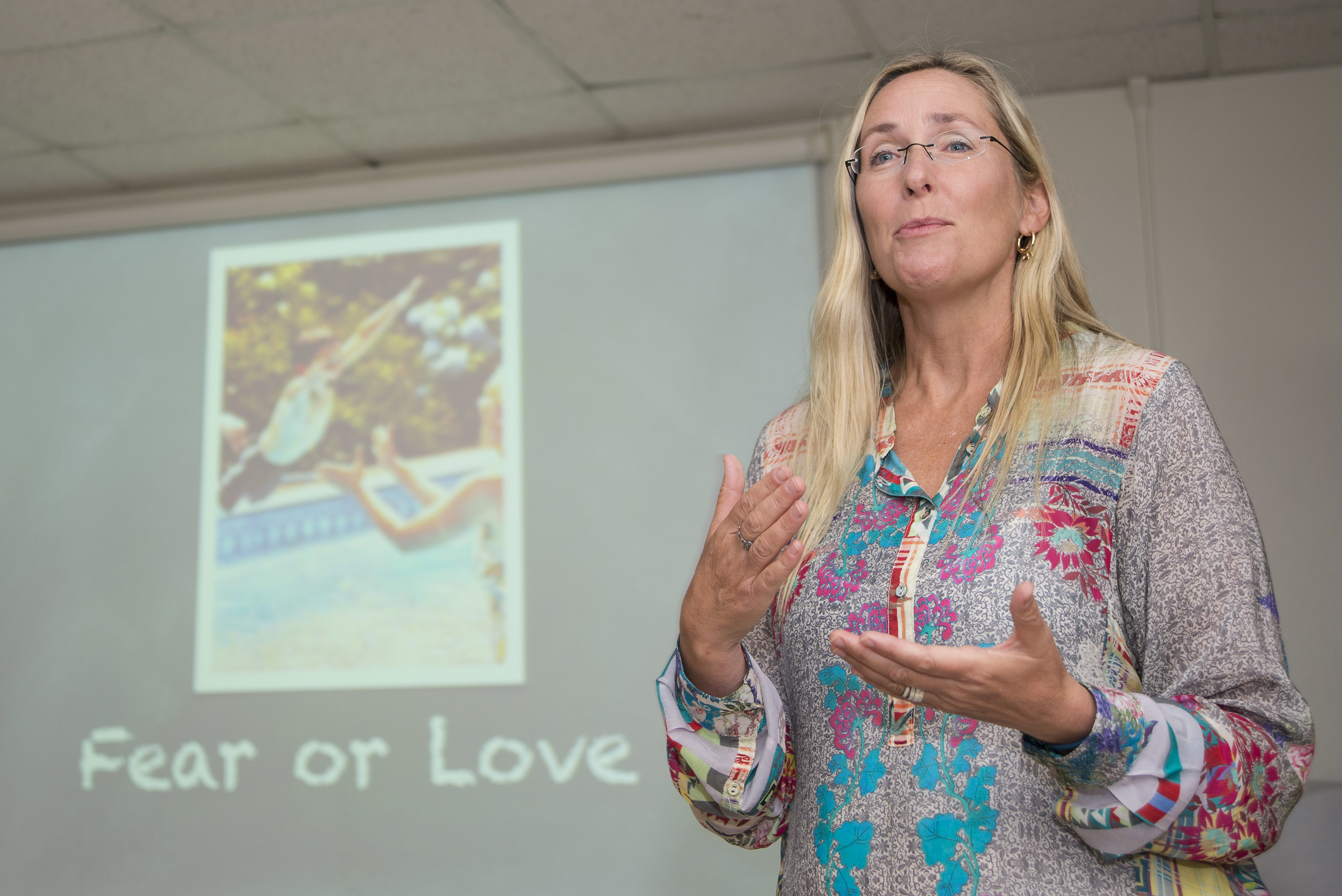
- Jesse's mother Scarlett Lewis presenting in 2016
- Formation: January 29, 2013; 13 years ago
- Type: 501(c)(3) non-profit organization
- Purpose: The Choose Love Movement was founded in honor of Sandy Hook victim/hero, Jesse Lewis, to spread his message of “Nurturing Healing Love"
- Headquarters: Sandy Hook, Connecticut, U.S.
- Region served: International
- Founder & Chief Movement Officer: Scarlett Lewis
- Website: chooselovemovement.org

The Jesse Lewis Choose Love Movement is a 501(c)(3) nonprofit organization founded in the United States that provides free Character Social Emotional Development (CSED) programs. Choose Love programming is being taught in over 10,000 schools, in all 50 states and over 120 countries, serving over 3 million children globally. This is the only organization that offers free lifespan Character Social Emotional Development programming, with consistent messaging for parents and caregivers as well as for communities and businesses.

== History ==
The Jesse Lewis Choose Love Movement was founded in 2013 in honor of Jesse McCord Lewis, a six-year-old killed in the Sandy Hook Elementary School shooting in Sandy Hook, Connecticut, on December 14, 2012. Nine of Jesse's classmates survived by fleeing when Jesse told them to run. Jesse's mother, Scarlett Lewis, set out to be part of the solution to violence and other "diseases of despair" that are escalating in schools, homes, and communities, and advocates for Social-emotional learning, character education, and mental health.

Three days after Jesse's murder, Scarlett returned to the family's farmhouse and found a message on their kitchen chalkboard that Jesse had written shortly before he died: "Norurting Helinn Love" (Nurturing Healing Love). These three words are not in the vernacular of someone Jesse's age and were phonetically spelled because Jesse was still learning to write. These three words are the foundational values of the movement, with their individual meaning forming a formula for choosing love. "Nurturing" means loving, kindness, and gratitude; "Healing" means forgiveness; and "Love" means compassion-in-action.

== Programs ==
In 2014, the Movement launched its Choose Love for Schools Program, a no-cost program for Pre-K through Grade 12 that provides lessons that delve into the Choose Love Formula to help educators and students create a safer, more connected school culture. This program, aligned with Collaborative for Academic, Social, and Emotional Learning, Common Core, and American School Counselor Association standards and fully incorporating state-of-the-art Character Social Emotional Development Model Standards from Character.org, also includes neuroscience and positive psychology to teach mindfulness, character, and emotional intelligence. The Choose Love for Schools Program is now the most taught program in some states.

The Movement has multiple programs, including Choose Love for Home, which brings the Choose Love Formula beyond the classroom to teach families how to manage their emotions, communicate in healthier ways, and grow together to form a more nurturing environment. Choose Love for Communities is a program for business owners, community leaders, law enforcement agencies, and political leaders to be part of the solution and to thoughtfully respond to any thought, action, or circumstance with love. Choose Love for Athletic Leadership Development is a program for athletes and leaders to incorporate the Choose Love Formula in any sports program to build character and create positive relationships on and off the playing field. Choose Love at Work helps organizations build the skills and mindset to become a high-performance organization in a way that is fun, natural, and benefits the lives of employers and employees. The workshop teaches teams how to engage with purpose, high ethics, courage, gratitude, forgiveness, and compassion.

In addition, the movement offers Choose Love C.A.R.E.S. (Cultivating Authentic Relationships in the Education System), Experiential Educator Wellness Workshops for school leaders and educators. The workshops provide greater awareness around the benefits of Character Social Emotional Development (CSED) and ways to feel more confident and equipped to integrate essential CSED practices within the classroom to create a safe and loving environment. Also, they cultivate positive, healthy mindsets, enhance personal well-being, and embrace Choose Love programming with ease to ultimately unite as a staff and better support the needs of students.
