= Warner Bros. Studio Tour Tokyo – The Making of Harry Potter =

Exhibition and studio tour in Japan

Warner Bros. Studio Tour Tokyo The Making of Harry Potter

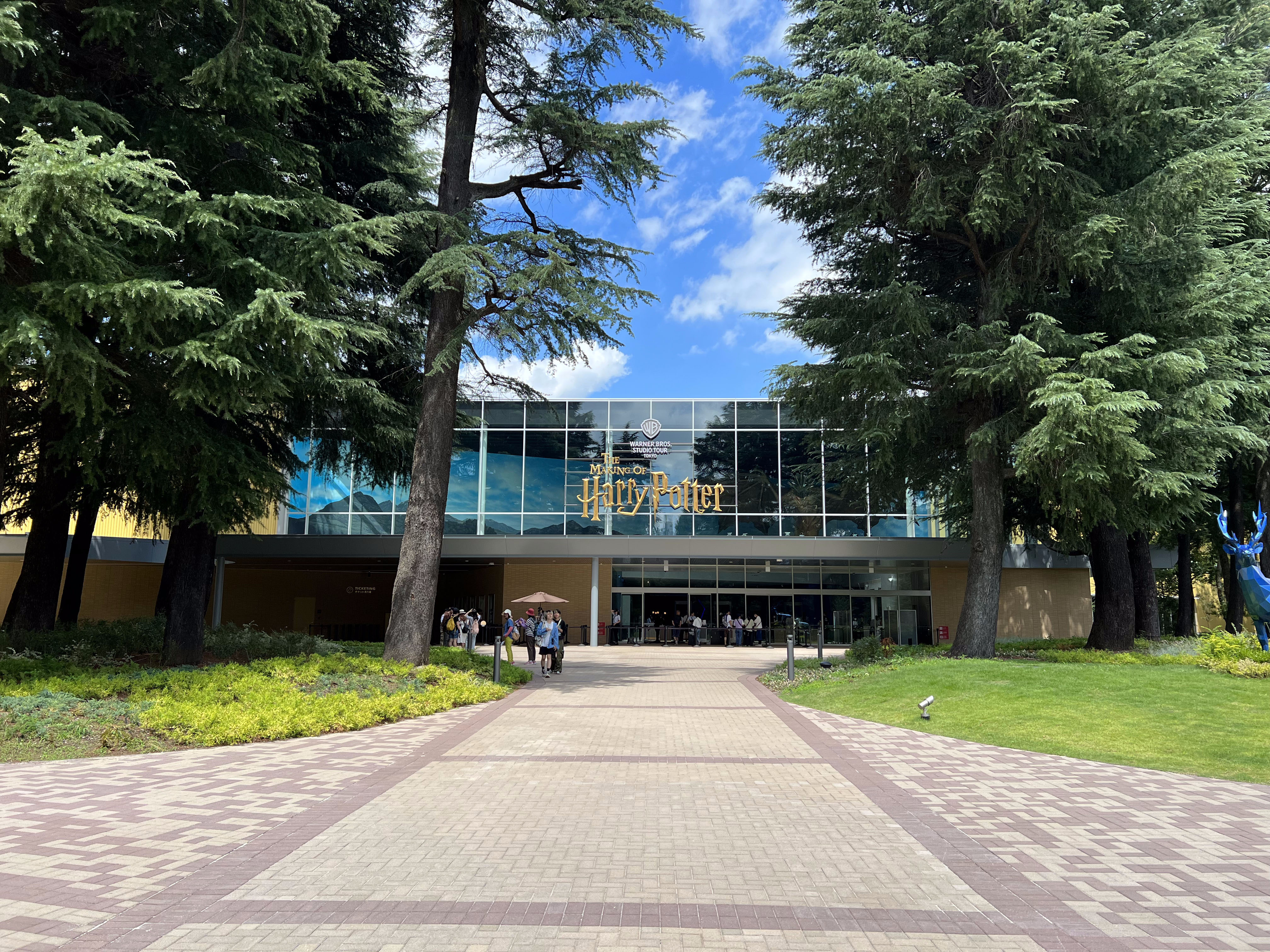
- Entrance to the studio tour

Nerima, Tokyo
- Coordinates: 35°44′45″N 139°38′45″E
- Status: Operating
- Opening date: 16 June 2023

Ride statistics
- Attraction type: Walk-through exhibition
- Designer: Thinkwell Group
- Theme: Harry Potter film series
- Site area: 30,000 m^{2} (320,000 sq ft)
- Duration: ~3 hours and 30 minutes (self-guided)
- Operator: Warner Bros. Studio Tour
- Owner: Skydance Corporation (Warner Bros. Entertainment)
- Wheelchair accessible
- Assistive listening available
- Closed captioning available

Warner Bros. Studio Tour Tokyo – The Making of Harry Potter (ワーナー ブラザース スタジオツアー東京 ‐ メイキング・オブ・ハリー・ポッター, Wānā Burazāsu Sutajio Tsuā Tōkyō – Meikingu Obu Harī Pottā) is a walk-through exhibition tour in Tokyo, Japan, owned by Warner Bros. and operated by their Studio Tour division. It is located in Nerima, in northwest of Tokyo, and houses a permanent exhibition of authentic costumes, props, and sets utilised in the production of the Harry Potter films, as well as behind-the-scenes production of visual effects.

== History ==
The development of the Warner Bros. Studio Tour Tokyo – The Making of Harry Potter is tied to the history of its location in Nerima, Tokyo.

=== Site acquisition and development ===
The Studio Tour was built on the grounds of the former Toshimaen Amusement Park, a historic recreational area that had operated for 94 years since its opening in 1926. In 2020, plans were finalized for the Tokyo Metropolitan Government to acquire a majority of the Toshimaen land to develop a new public park, with the remaining area being used for the new Harry Potter attraction. The amusement park officially closed on August 31, 2020, to make way for the development.

The project was a collaborative effort between Warner Bros. Studio Tour, Warner Bros. Japan, Seibu Railway, Itochu Corporation, and Fuyo General Lease, with the Studio Tour facilities being developed in conjunction with the new public park. Seibu Railway, which services the area, renovated Toshimaen Station (now called Toshimaen-mae Station) to feature a Harry Potter theme, including a station platform inspired by London's King's Cross.

=== Opening ===
The Warner Bros. Studio Tour Tokyo – The Making of Harry Potter was officially announced in August 2020. The attraction, which is the second of its kind in the world after the original in London, was promoted as the world's largest indoor Harry Potter attraction. The facility is a walk-through, behind-the-scenes entertainment experience, not a typical theme park with rides.

The Studio Tour officially opened its doors to the public on June 16, 2023. It offers unique features and sets that distinguish it from the London facility, while continuing to showcase the authentic costumes, props, and filmmaking secrets from the Harry Potter and Fantastic Beasts film series.

== Tour ==
Unlike theme parks, the Studio Tour is not ride-based but focuses on showcasing authentic sets, original costumes, and props to reveal the artistry and filmmaking techniques used in the Wizarding World films.

=== Exhibits ===
The facility features many iconic sets recreated by the original filmmakers, including the Great Hall at Hogwarts. Guests can step onto Platform 9¾ to board the authentic Hogwarts Express and venture into the Forbidden Forest to encounter magical creatures. Further exploration continues on the outdoor Backlot, where familiar scenes like the Dursleys' house on Privet Drive and the triple-decker Knight Bus are on display.

=== Tokyo exclusives ===
The Tokyo Studio Tour features several sets and experiences unique to the location, including a massive, full-scale recreation of the Ministry of Magic Atrium. Visitors can also take part in interactive green screen sets, such as appearing in a moving portrait on the Grand Staircase or cheering at a Quidditch match. The experience is completed with themed food and drink at places like the world's largest Butterbeer Bar, and access to the world's largest dedicated Harry Potter shop, featuring Tokyo-exclusive merchandise.

== Gallery ==
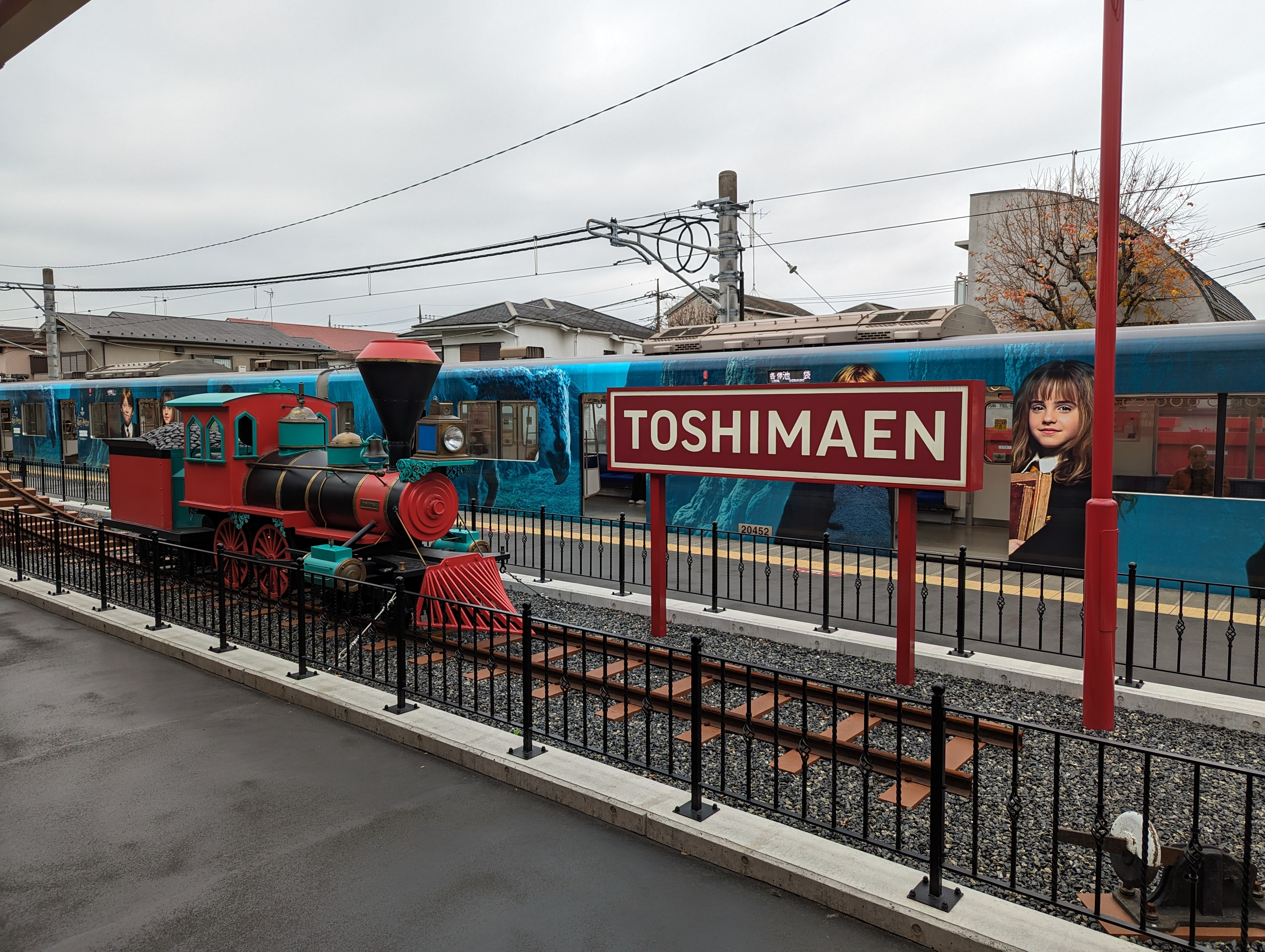
Warner Bros. Studio Tour Tokyo Toshimaen Station

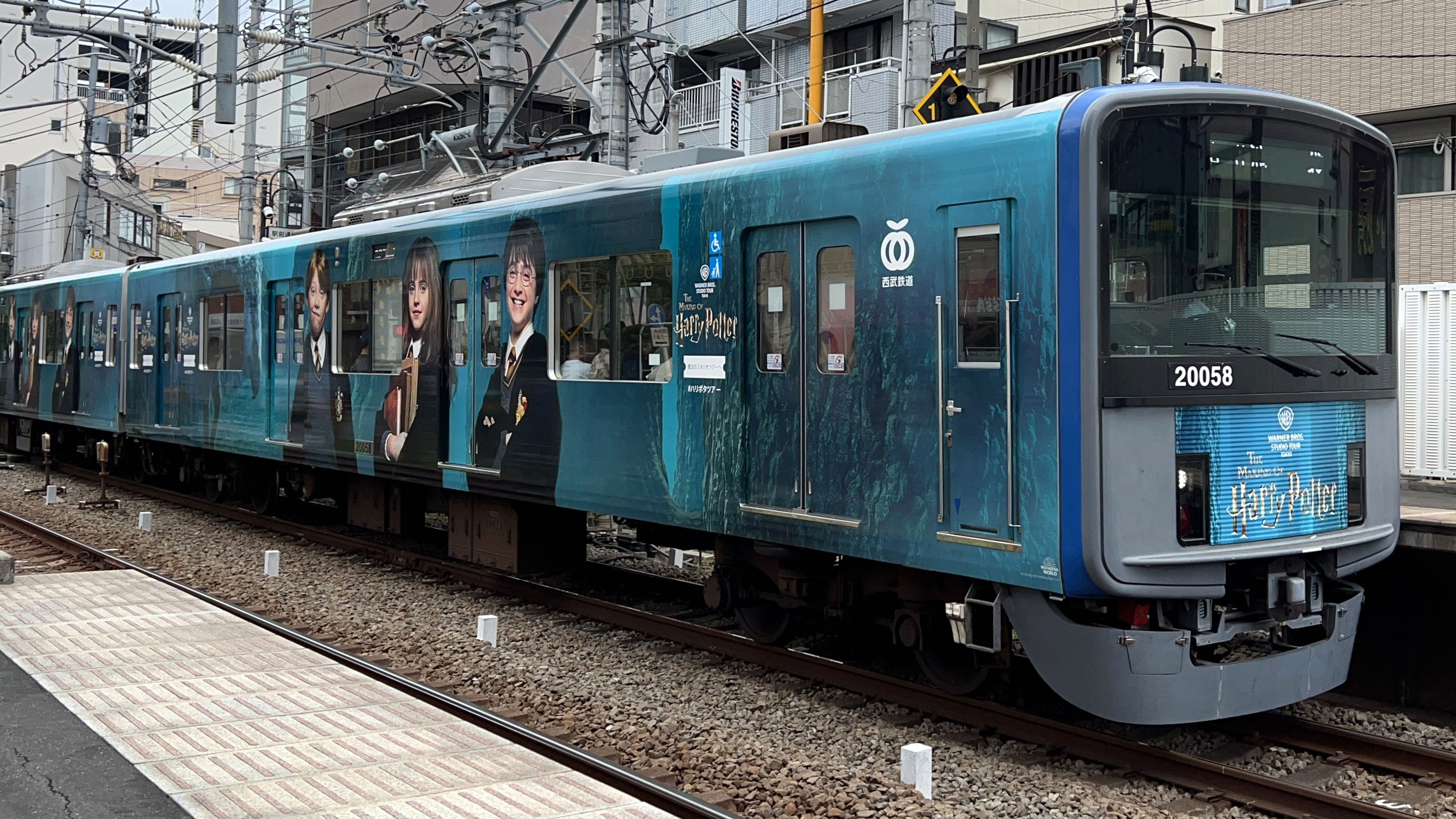
Warner Bros. Studio Tour Tokyo Express of Seibu Ikebukuro Line

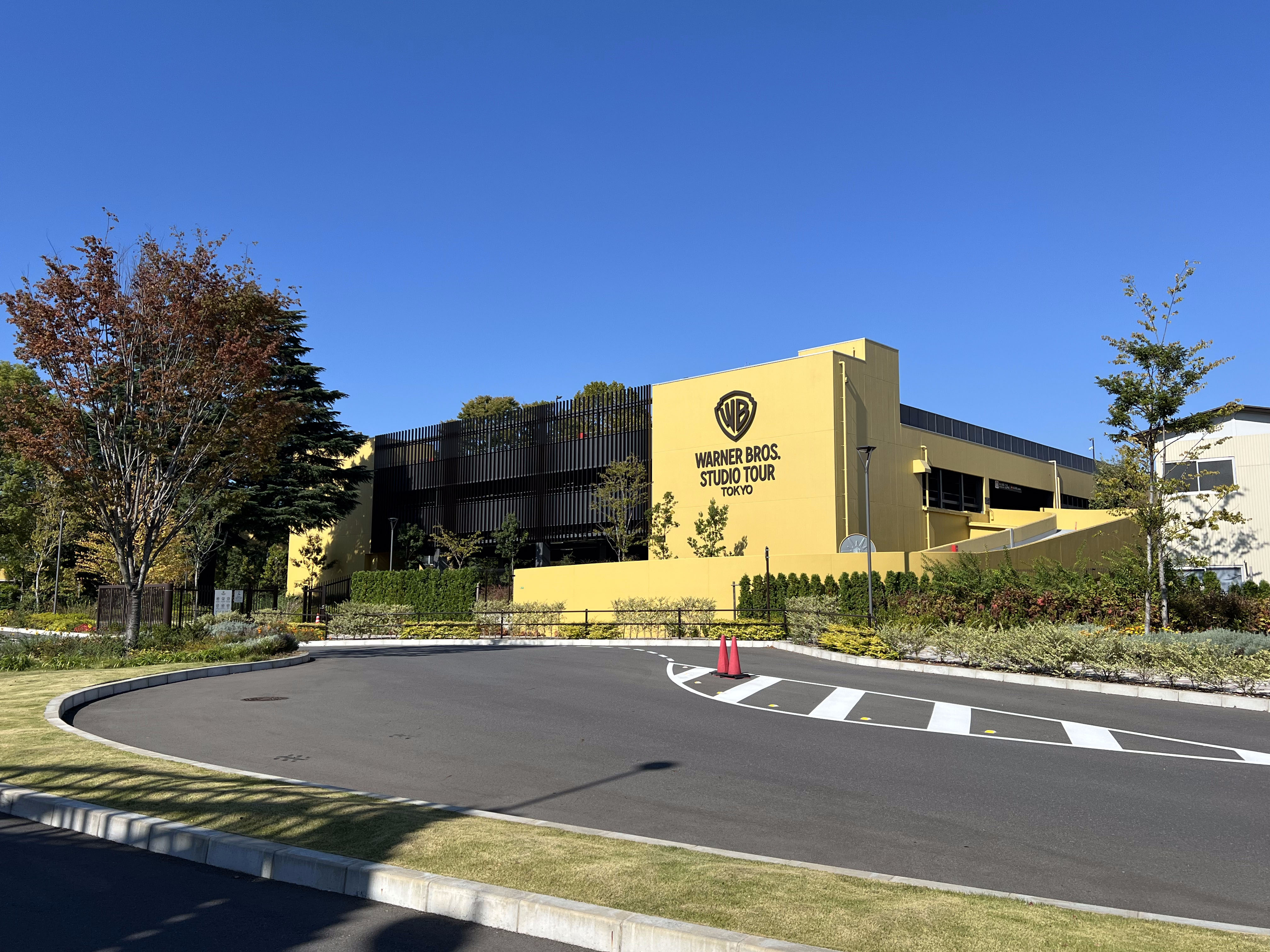
Warner Bros Studio Tour Tokyo exterior

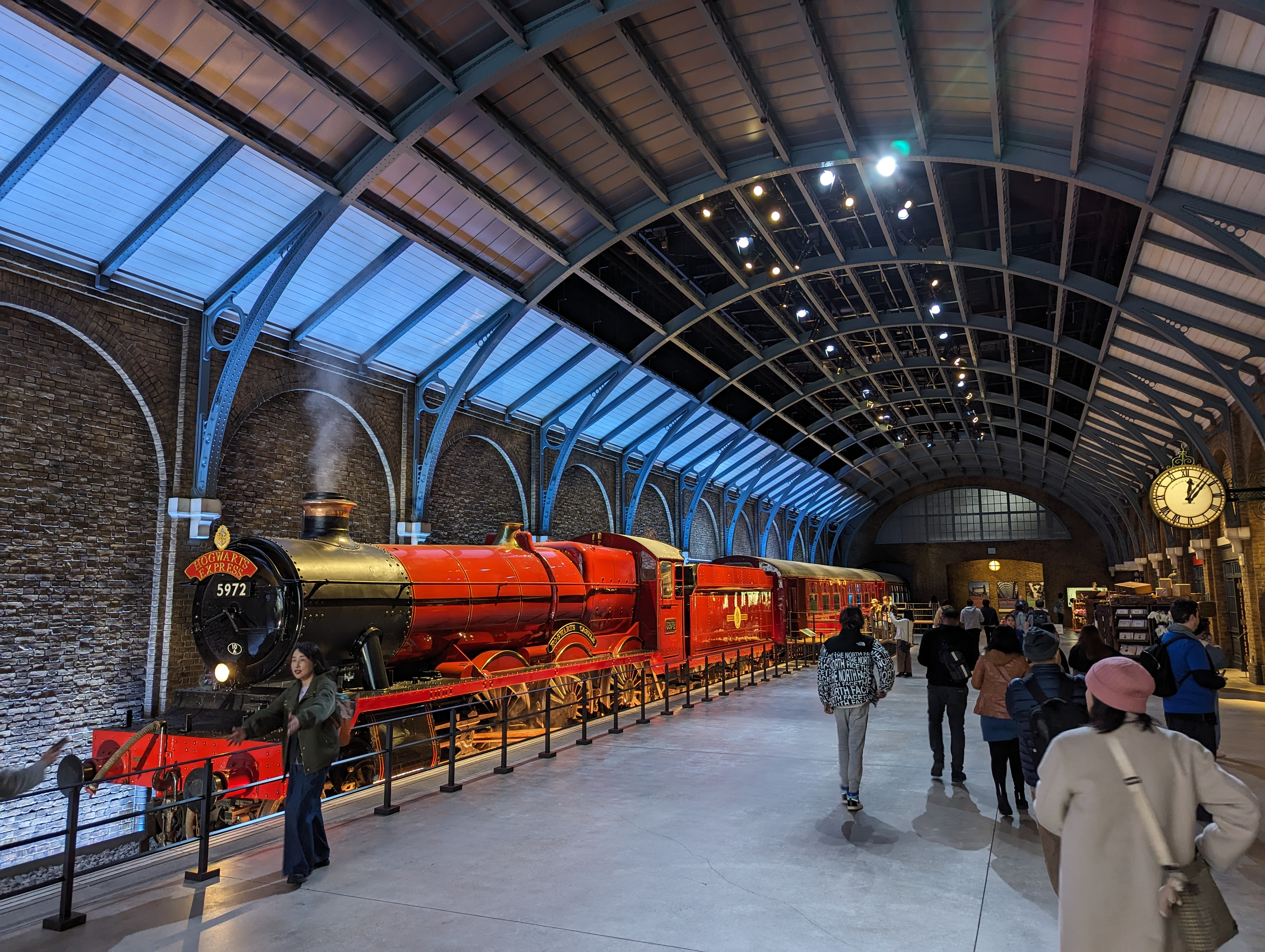
Hogwarts Express

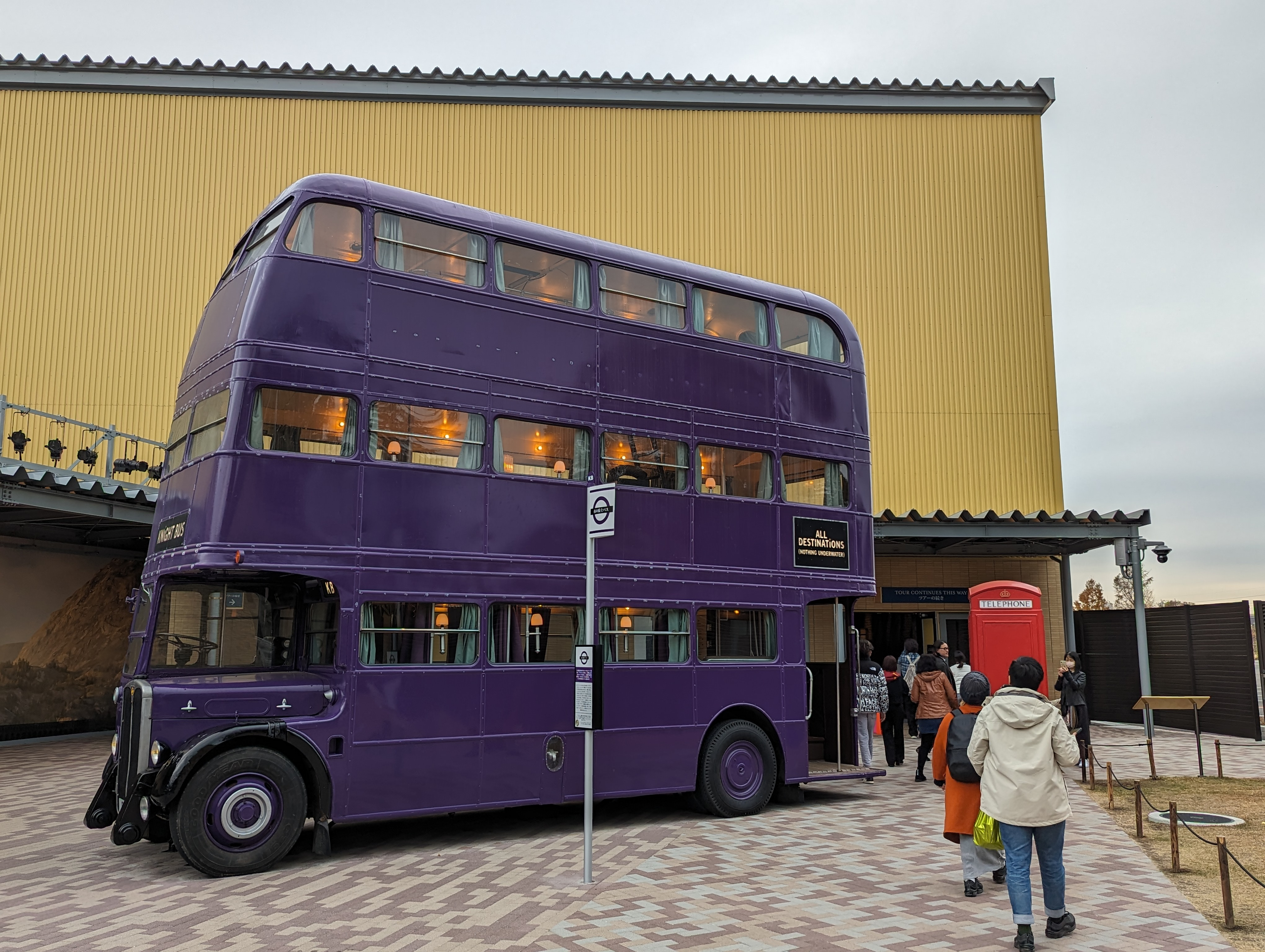
The Knight Bus

== See also ==
- Warner Bros. Studio Tour Hollywood
- Warner Bros. Studio Tour London – The Making of Harry Potter
- Warner Bros. Studio Tour Shanghai – The Making of Harry Potter
- The Wizarding World of Harry Potter
