= The Wizarding World of Harry Potter (Universal Studios Japan) =

Themed area in Universal Studios Japan

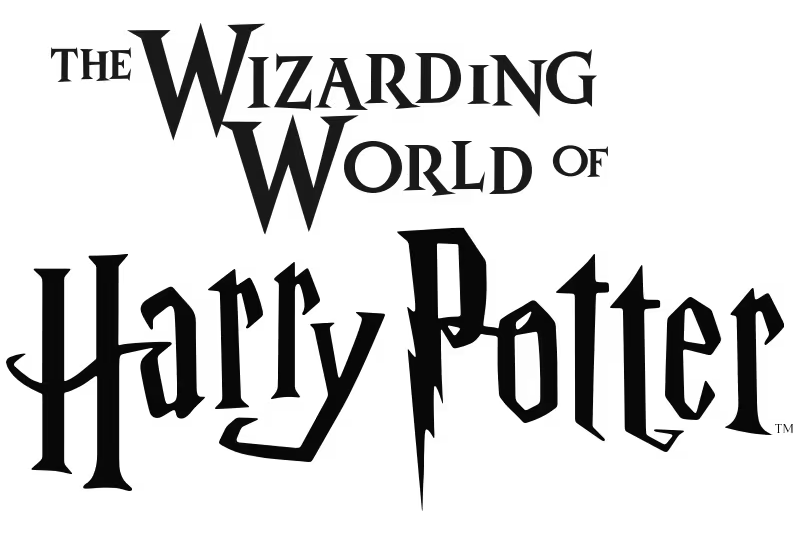

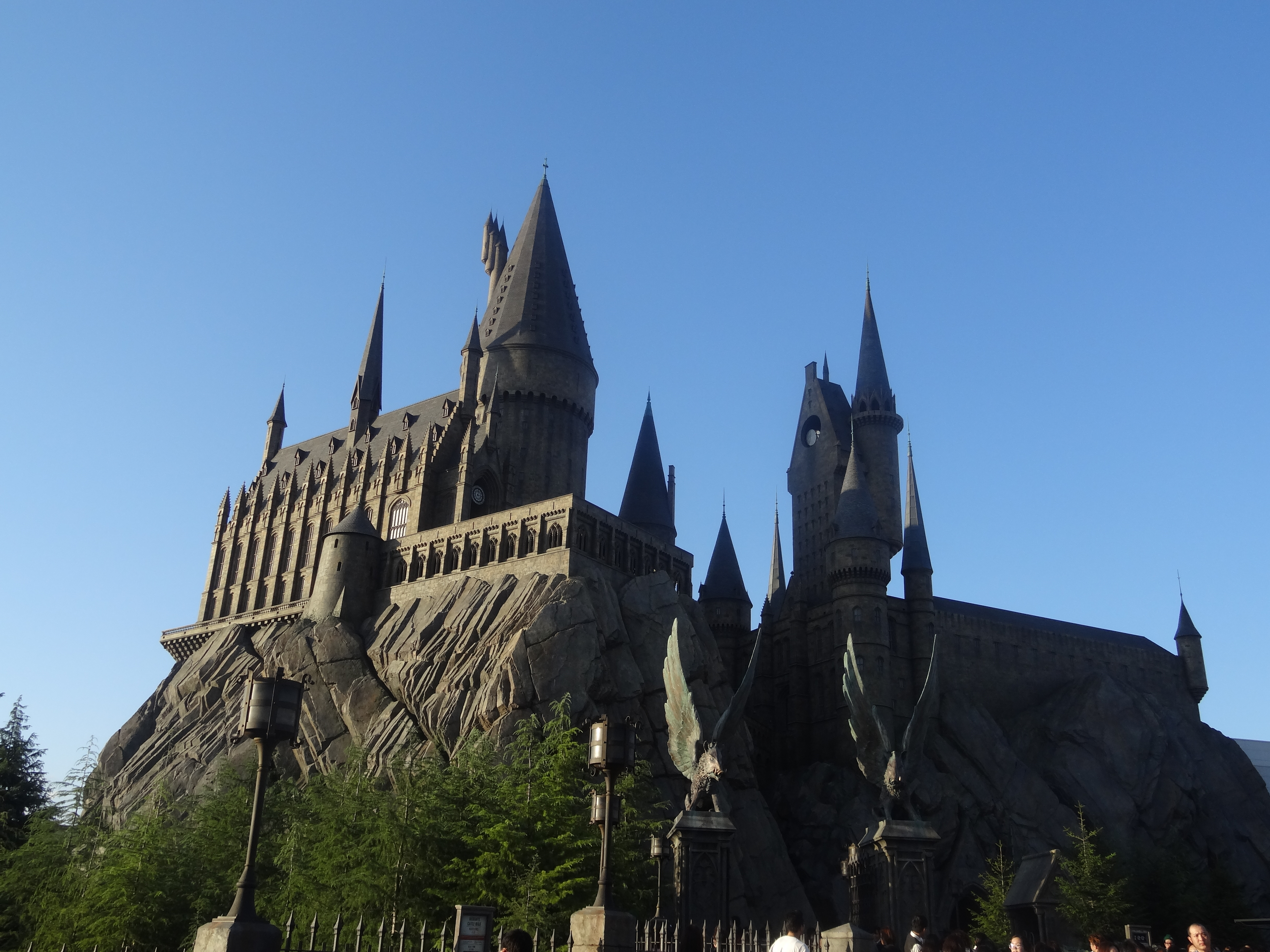
- Hogwarts Castle, which houses Harry Potter and the Forbidden Journey, at Universal Studios Japan
- Location: Universal Studios Japan
- Status: Operating
- Opened: July 15, 2014
- Theme: Harry Potter (book series, film series and universe)

The Wizarding World of Harry Potter (ウィザーディング・ワールド・オブ・ハリー・ポッター, Wizādingu Wārudo obu Harī Pottā) at Universal Studios Japan is a themed area based on the Harry Potter series built at Universal Studios Japan theme park in Osaka, Japan. It is a collaboration of Universal Destinations & Experiences and Warner Bros. Entertainment. It opened to the public on July 15, 2014.

It contains the Harry Potter and the Forbidden Journey ride and the Flight of the Hippogriff roller coaster that debuted at the Wizarding World of Harry Potter at Universal Orlando Resort in 2010. The village of Hogsmeade is also recreated. Two features in the Japanese park not found in Orlando are Hogwarts's Black Lake and live owls.

== Attractions ==
The table below shows the different attractions across the area.

Name	Type of Attraction
Flight of the Hippogriff	Ride
Harry Potter and the Forbidden Journey	Ride
Frog Choir	Show
Ollivanders Experience in Hogsmeade	Show
Triwizard Spirit Rally	Show
Wand Studies	Show
Dementor Attack	Show
Hog's Head	Dining
Three Broomsticks	Dining
Dervish and Banges	Shops
Filch's Emporium of Confiscated Goods	Shops
Honeydukes	Shops
Ollivanders Wand Shop in Hogsmeade	Shops
Owl Post & Owlery	Shops
Wiseacre's Wizarding Equipment	Shops
Gladrags Wizardwear	Shops
Zonko's Joke Shop	Shops

== See also ==
- The Wizarding World of Harry Potter
- The Wizarding World of Harry Potter (Universal Studios Hollywood)
- The Wizarding World of Harry Potter (Universal Studios Beijing)
