= The Wizarding World of Harry Potter (Universal Studios Beijing) =

Themed area in Universal Studios Beijing

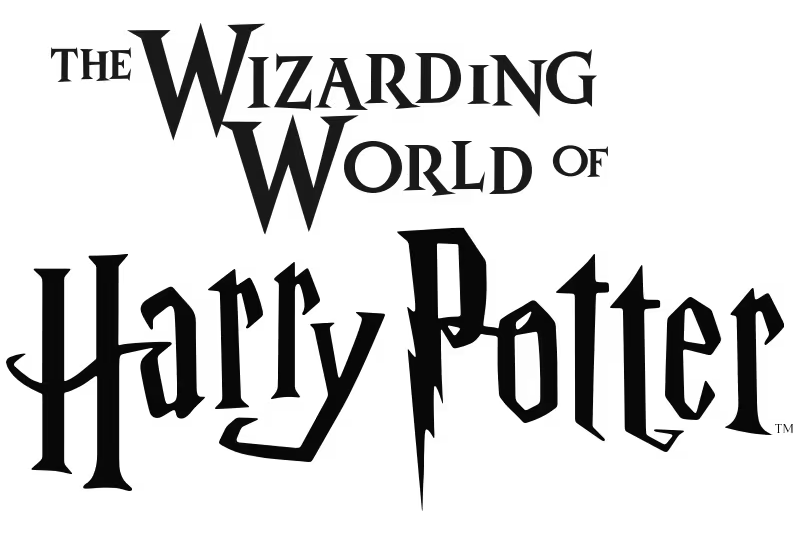

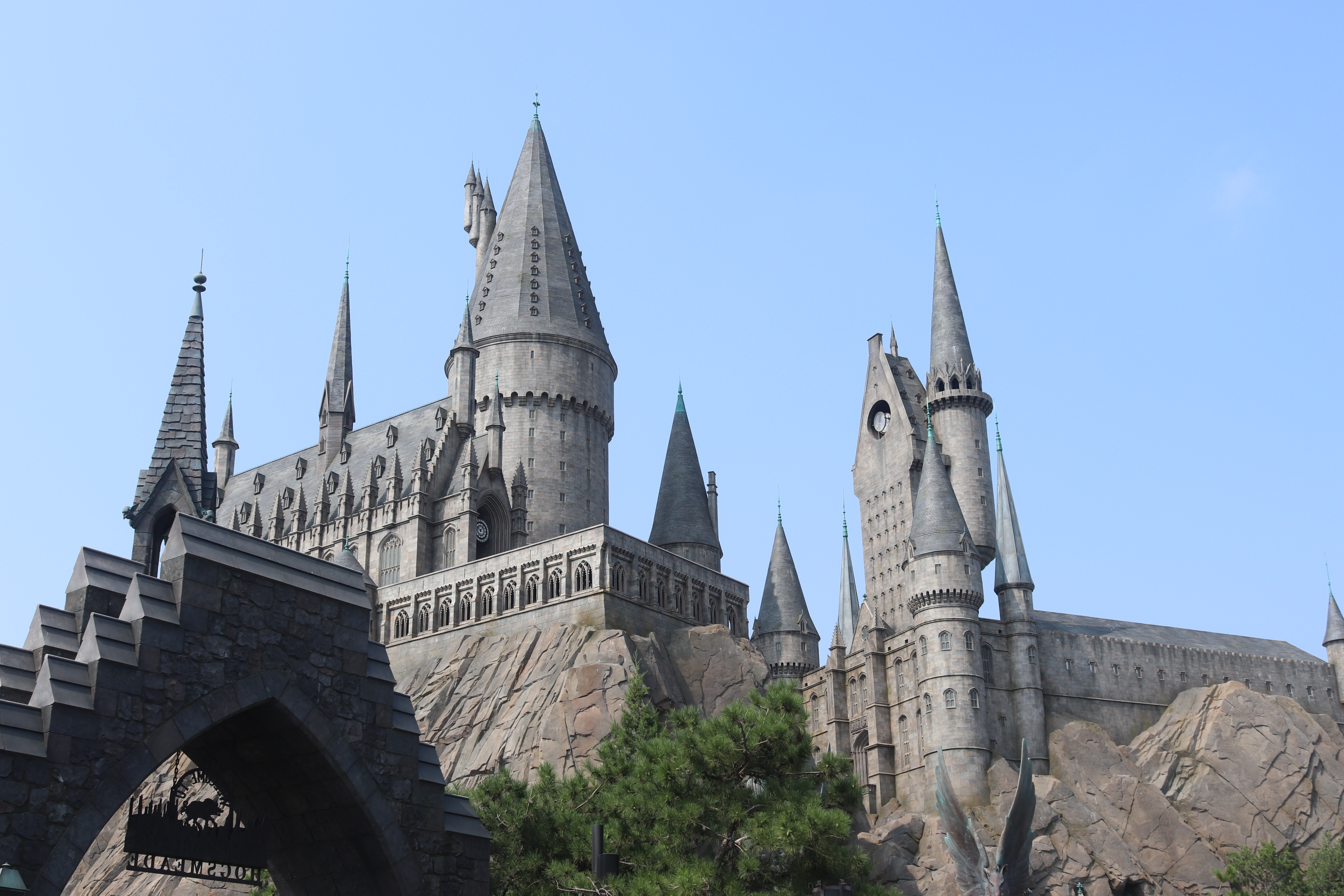
- Hogwarts Castle, which houses Harry Potter and the Forbidden Journey, at Universal Studios Beijing
- Location: Universal Studios Beijing
- Status: Operating
- Opened: September 20, 2021
- Theme: Harry Potter (book series, film series and universe)

The Wizarding World of Harry Potter (Chinese: 哈利·波特的魔法世界) at Universal Studios Beijing is a themed area at the Universal Studios Beijing theme park in Beijing, China. It is the fourth installation of the Wizarding World of Harry Potter themed lands, following those at Universal Orlando, Universal Studios Japan, and Universal Studios Hollywood.

The land officially opened to the public on September 20, 2021, coinciding with the grand opening of Universal Studios Beijing. It is themed to the village of Hogsmeade and features the iconic Hogwarts Castle.

== History ==
The development of Universal Studios Beijing was announced in 2014, including The Wizarding World of Harry Potter area confirmed to be one of the signature themed lands. Construction for the resort began in 2016 and was completed in April 2021, with the park and the themed land opening on September 20, 2021.

== Layout and Experience ==
The Wizarding World of Harry Potter in Beijing is anchored by recreations of Hogwarts Castle and Hogsmeade Village. The land's primary attractions include two major rides: Harry Potter and the Forbidden Journey, an indoor motion-simulator dark ride housed within the castle, and Flight of the Hippogriff, a family-oriented outdoor roller coaster.

Beyond the rides, the area offers the interactive Ollivanders Experience and several key retail and dining venues.

| Name | Opened | Description |
|---|---|---|
| Harry Potter and the Forbidden Journey | 2021 | A motion simulator dark ride based on the Harry Potter film series that features real sets and screens. |
| Flight of the Hippogriff | 2021 | A Mack Rides Youngstar Coaster. |
| Ollivanders Experience in Hogsmeade | 2021 | A guest is chosen to test out various wands until they find a match, punctuated by music and special effects. |
| Frog Choir | 2021 | An a cappella stage show featuring amphibian hand puppets. |

Notable dining establishments, such as The Three Broomsticks restaurant and the adjacent Hog's Head pub, offer food and beverage items from the Harry Potter series, including the signature Butterbeer. Retail shops within the area include Hogsmeade Station, Zonko's Joke Shop, Gladrags Wizardwear, Owl Post & Owlery, Wiseacre's Wizarding Equipment, Ollivanders Wand Shop in Hogsmeade, Honeydukes sweet shop, Filch's Emporium of Confiscated Goods, and Dervish and Banges. Live street entertainment, such as the Frog Choir performance and the Triwizard Spirit Rally, and the evening Nighttime Lights at Hogwarts Castle projection show, can also be found.

== Gallery ==
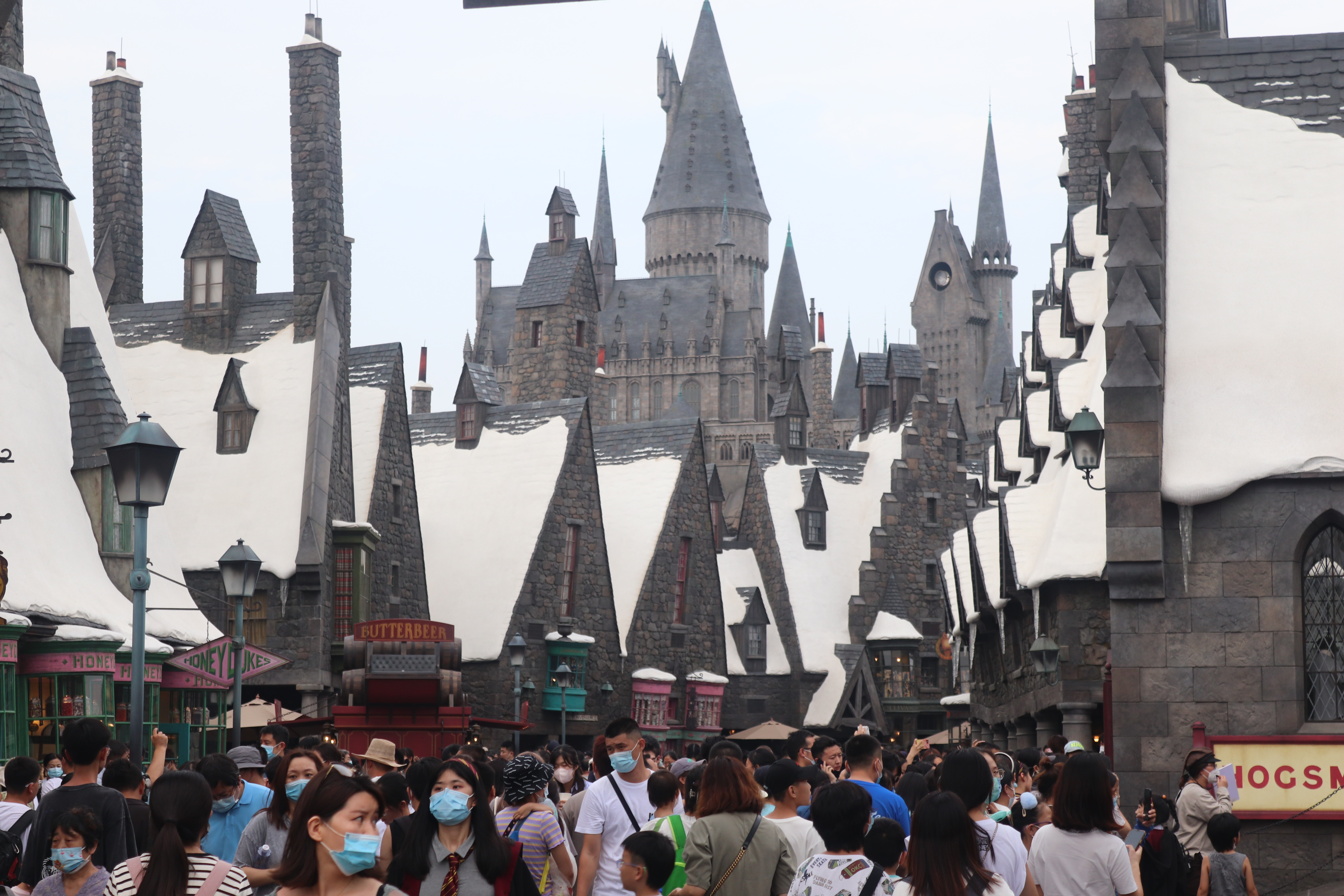
Hogsmeade

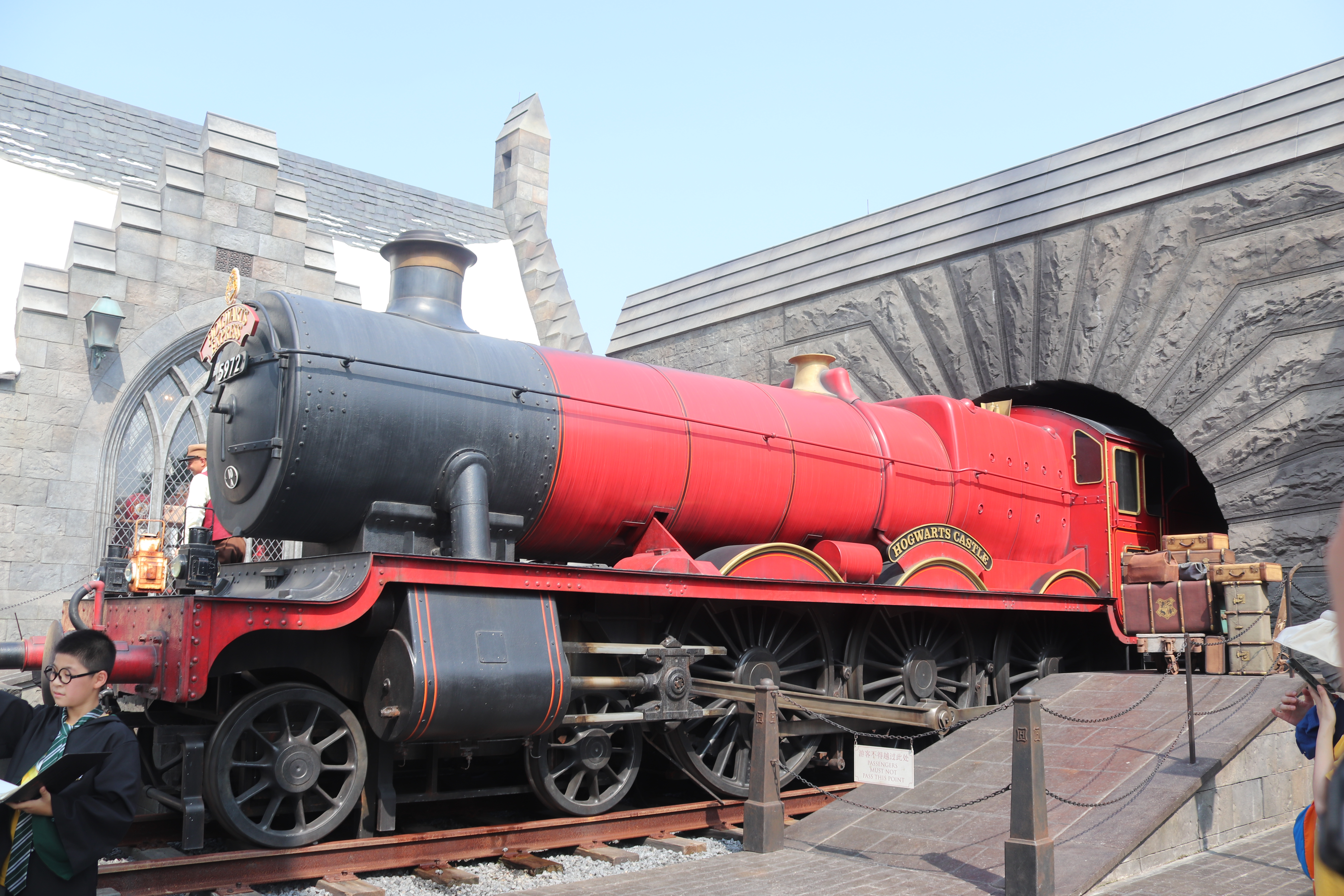
Hogwarts Express

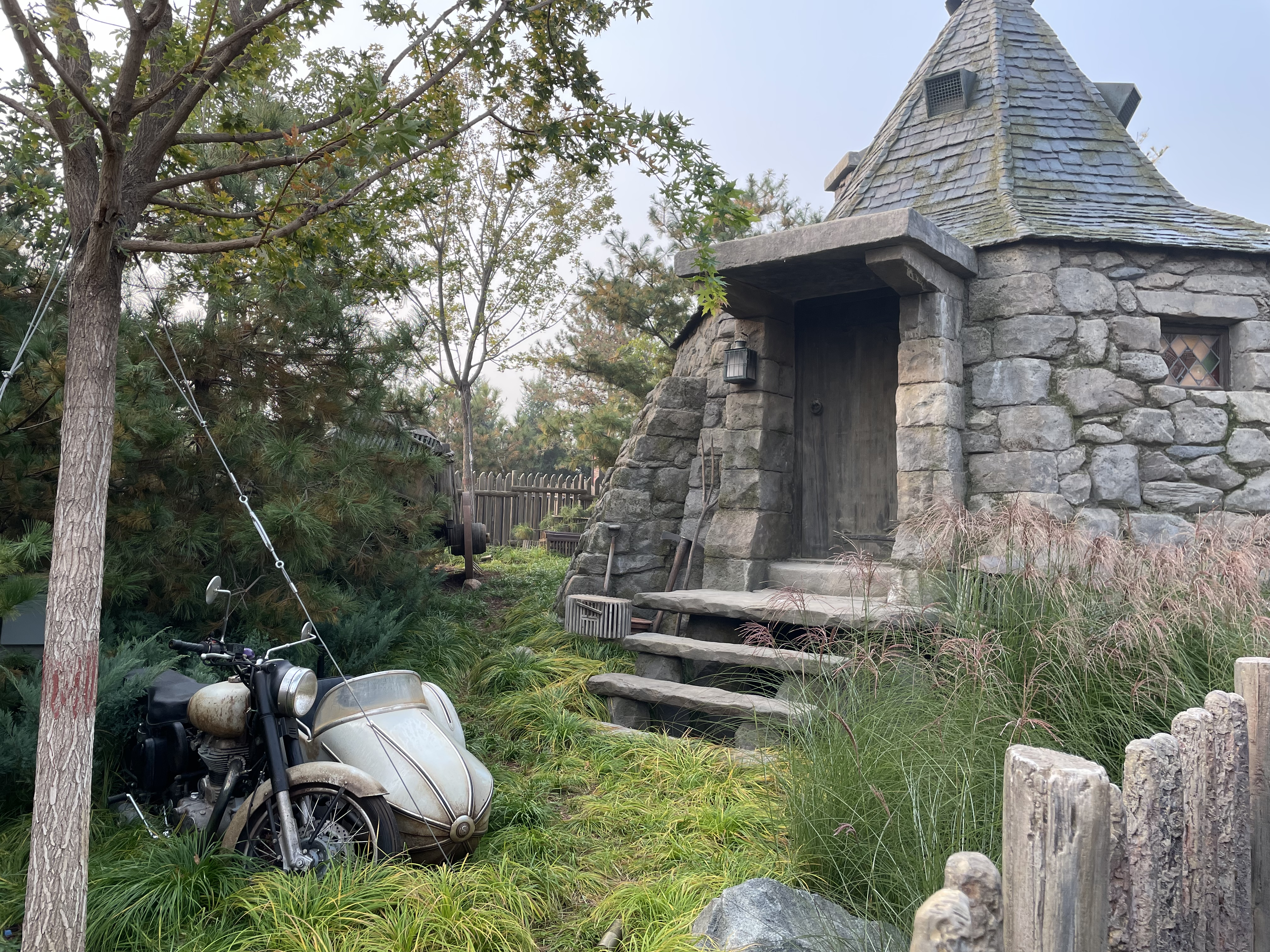
Hagrid's Hut

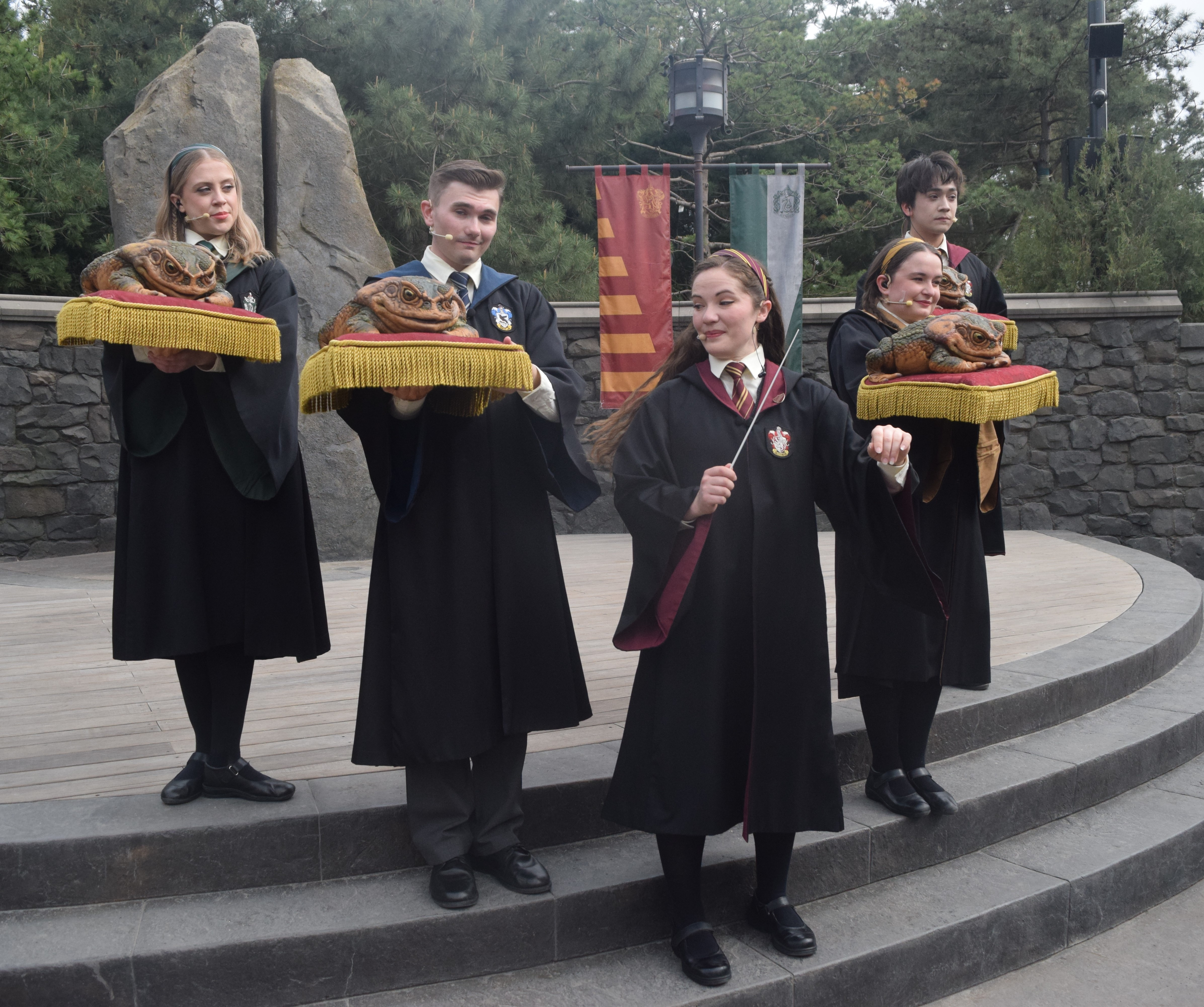
Frog Choir performers

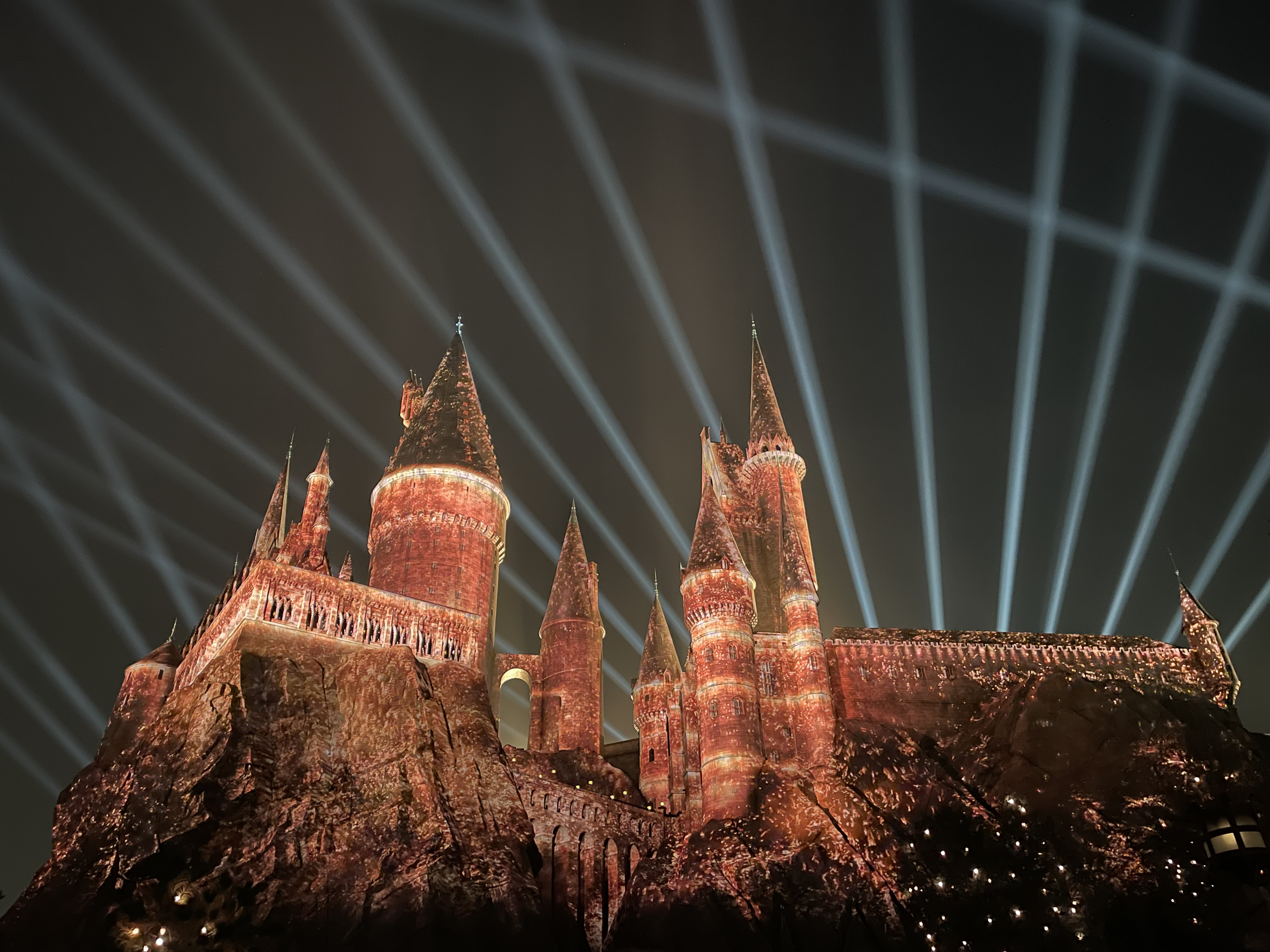
The park's "Nighttime Lights at Hogwarts Castle" projection show

== See also ==
- The Wizarding World of Harry Potter
- The Wizarding World of Harry Potter (Universal Orlando Resort)
- The Wizarding World of Harry Potter (Universal Studios Hollywood)
- The Wizarding World of Harry Potter (Universal Studios Japan)
- Warner Bros. Studio Tour Shanghai – The Making of Harry Potter
