= Warner Bros. Studio Tour Shanghai – The Making of Harry Potter =

Exhibition and studio tour

Warner Bros. Studio Tour Shanghai The Making of Harry Potter

Minhang, Shanghai
- Coordinates: 31°08′27″N 121°24′36″E
- Opening date: 2027 (planned)

Ride statistics
- Attraction type: Walk-through exhibition
- Theme: Harry Potter film series
- Site area: 53,000 m^{2} (570,000 sq ft)
- Operator: Warner Bros. Studio Tour
- Owner: Skydance Corporation (Warner Bros. Entertainment)

Warner Bros. Studio Tour Shanghai – The Making of Harry Potter (Chinese: 華納兄弟工作室巡演：哈利波特制作特輯) is an upcoming studio tour and visitor attraction located in the Minhang District of Shanghai, China, owned by Warner Bros. The attraction will be operated in partnership with Jinjiang International, and is the third permanent The Making of Harry Potter Studio Tour in the world, following the original in London and its second location in Tokyo.

== History ==
The project was officially announced by Warner Bros. Discovery and Jinjiang International in February 2025. The announcement followed a fast-tracked negotiation process, with construction expected to begin in the latter half of the same year. The attraction is part of a larger renovation and revitalization of the site of the old Jinjiang Action Park, which opened in 1984 and closed in January 2025 to commence the transformation.

The Shanghai facility is planned to be the largest Warner Bros. Studio Tour dedicated to the Wizarding World franchise globally, covering an area of approximately 53,000 square meters. The attraction is distinct from theme park experiences such as The Wizarding World of Harry Potter at Universal Studios Beijing, offering a museum-style, behind-the-scenes look at the filmmaking process. The attraction will be operated in partnership with Jinjiang International, a tourism and hospitality company owned by the Shanghai Municipal People's Government.

== Tour ==
The attraction is designed to be predominantly indoors, with about 90% of the visitor experience taking place inside soundstages and exhibits.

The Studio Tour is expected to operate on a full reservation system, requiring visitors to book a specific date and entry time in advance to manage crowd flow. The facility is projected to attract approximately 2 million visitors annually.

== Transportation ==
The Studio Tour is being constructed at the site of Jinjiang Action Park in the Minhang District of Shanghai. The location is easily accessible, situated near the Shanghai Metro Line 1's Jinjiang Park station.

== See also ==
- Warner Bros. Studio Tour
- Warner Bros. Studio Tour Hollywood
- Warner Bros. Studio Tour London – The Making of Harry Potter
- Warner Bros. Studio Tour Tokyo – The Making of Harry Potter
- The Wizarding World of Harry Potter
