= The Wizarding World of Harry Potter (Universal Studios Hollywood) =

Area at Universal Studios Hollywood

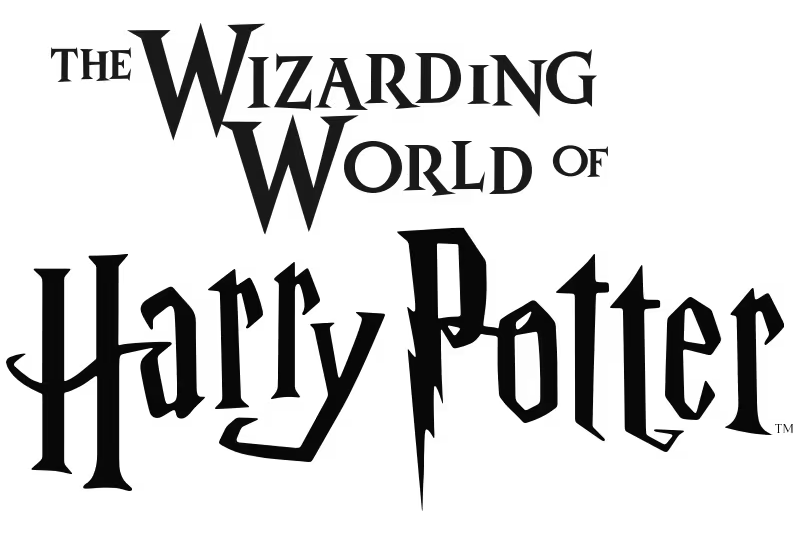

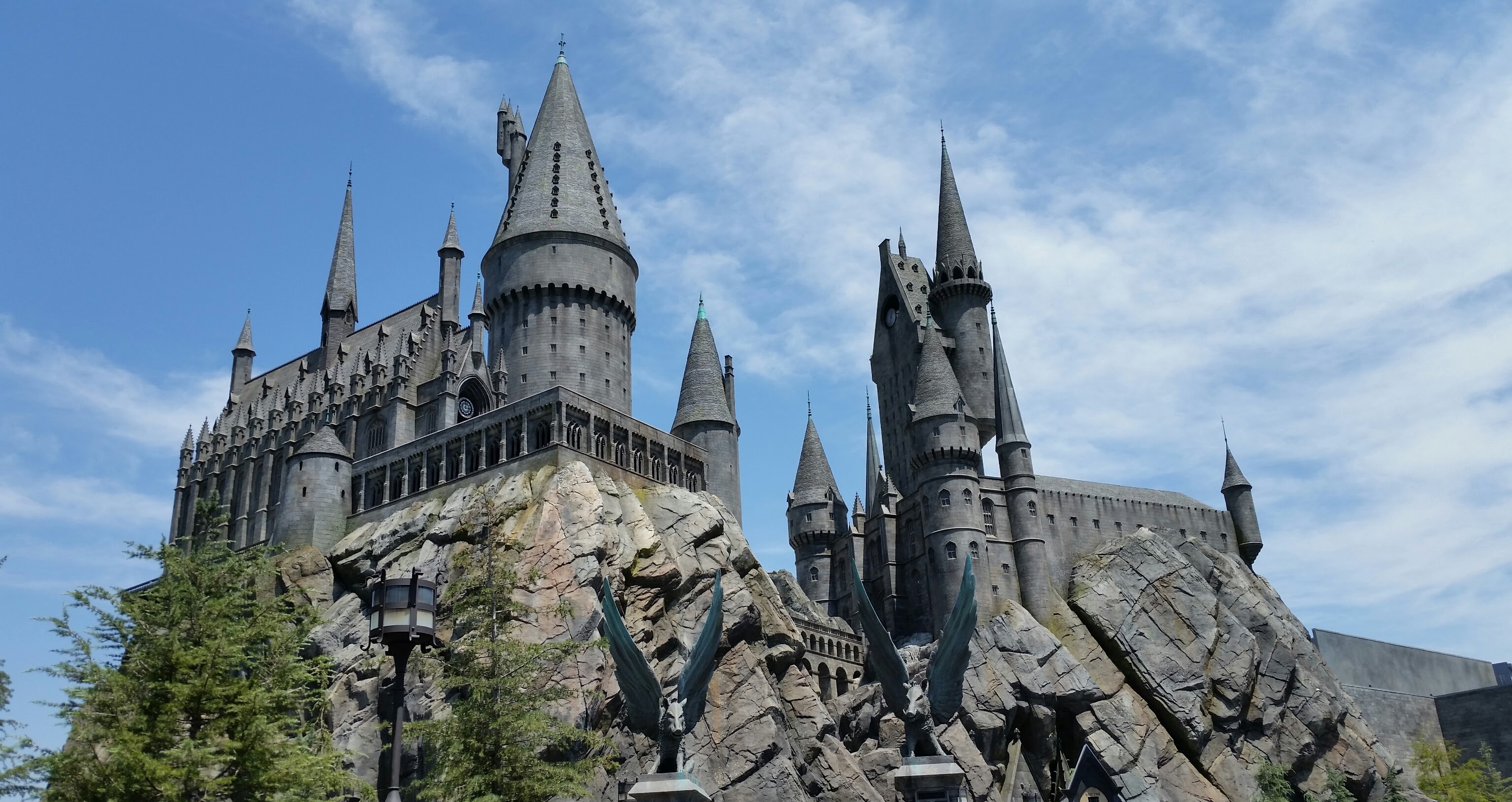
- Hogwarts Castle, which houses Harry Potter and the Forbidden Journey, at Universal Studios Hollywood
- Interactive map of The Wizarding World of Harry Potter
- Location: Universal Studios Hollywood
- Theme: Harry Potter (book series, film series and universe
- Coordinates: 34°08′17.50″N 118°21′11.64″W
- Status: Operating
- Opened: April 7, 2016
- Replaced: Gibson Amphitheatre; The Adventures of Curious George

The Wizarding World of Harry Potter at Universal Studios Hollywood theme park is an area themed to the Harry Potter media franchise, adapting elements from the film series and novels by J.K. Rowling. The area was designed by Universal Creative from an exclusive license with Warner Bros. It is the fourth Harry Potter-themed area to open at a Universal theme park.

After the successful debut of a Hogwarts themed area at Universal Orlando Resort and Universal Studios Japan, Universal Parks & Resorts announced plans to build a third Hogsmeade-themed Wizarding World of Harry Potter at Universal Studios Hollywood on December 6, 2011. The Wizarding World of Harry Potter at Universal Studios Hollywood officially opened on April 7, 2016.

== Background ==
On December 1, 2011, the Wall Street Journal reported that Universal Studios Hollywood was going to add its version of Hogsmeade, similar to the Islands of Adventure's Wizarding World of Harry Potter. The report also detailed the possibility that Universal Parks & Resorts would open additional Harry Potter-themed areas at Universal Studios Singapore and Universal Studios Japan as well as a location in Spain. This report was widely relayed by other media sources. On December 6, 2011, Universal Studios Hollywood announced plans to build the Wizarding World of Harry Potter — Hogsmeade at the park. Universal Parks & Resorts executives Tom Williams and Ron Meyer were accompanied by Warner Bros. executives, the Governor of California Jerry Brown as well as James and Oliver Phelps who played the Weasley twins in the films. The announcement came with very few details of what would be built, however, it did confirm that the Gibson Amphitheatre would be demolished and a re-creation of Hogwarts and Harry Potter and the Forbidden Journey would be constructed. The last show at the Gibson Amphitheatre was held on September 6, 2013, prior to its closure and subsequent demolition.

On April 23, 2013, NBCUniversal made the final step by receiving a unanimous vote in approval of the 25-year expansion by the county Board of Supervisors. This $1.6 billion expansion was expected to greatly boost tourism and the local entertainment industry, as well as create 30,000 jobs during construction.

On December 8, 2015, it was announced that the area would open on April 7, 2016. The announcement featured actress Evanna Lynch, who played Luna Lovegood in the Harry Potter films. The area's soft opening was on March 31, 2016.

== Attractions ==
Similar to the Wizarding World in Japan, this area included Harry Potter and the Forbidden Journey and Flight of the Hippogriff, along with Ollivander's Wand Shop Show, and the Frog Choir and Triwizard Spirit Rally.

Wands purchased from Ollivander's Wand Shop can be used to perform "magic" at various indicated locations, using sensors that track the movements of the wands. While performing different "spells" from the Harry Potter universe, fans can produce different reactions, such as unlocking a cabinet, opening a box of candy (Chocolate Frogs), and forcing a ruler to lower itself.

The table below show the different attractions across the area.

Name	Type of Attraction
Flight of the Hippogriff	Ride
Harry Potter and the Forbidden Journey	Ride
Hog's head	Dining
Three Broomsticks	Dining
Dervish and Banges	Shops
Filch's Emporium of Confiscated Goods	Shops
Honeydukes	Shops
Ollivanders Wand Shop in Hogsmeade	Shops
Owl Post & Owlery	Shops
Wiseacre's Wizarding Equipment	Shops
Gladrags Wizardwear	Shops
Zonko's Joke Shop	Shops

== Dining and shopping ==
- The Three Broomsticks and Hog's Head Pub
- Ollivander's Wand Shop
- Owl Post
- Wiseacre's Wizarding Equipment
- Gladrags Wizardwear
- Dervish and Banges
- Filch's Emporium of Confiscated Goods
- Honeydukes
- Zonko's

== See also ==
- The Wizarding World of Harry Potter (Universal Studios Japan)
- The Wizarding World of Harry Potter (Universal Studios Beijing)
