= Warner Bros. Studio Tour =

Public attractions

- Type: Division of Warner Bros. Entertainment Inc.
- Number of locations: 3 (1 Coming Soon)
- Area served: Japan, United Kingdom, United States
- Key people: Sarah Roots (Executive VP for Studio Tours)
- Services: Walk-through exhibition and studio tour
- Owner: Skydance Corporation
- Parent: Warner Bros. Entertainment
- Website: warnerbros.com/studio-tours/

Warner Bros. Studio Tour (or Warner Bros. Studio Tours) is a chain of public attractions owned and run by Skydance Corporation through Warner Bros. Entertainment.

== Studio Tours ==
The studio tours in Hollywood and London are both built into existing film studios, offering an authentic glimpse into the techniques and craft of filmmaking. The Tokyo facility is a purpose-built, standalone visitor attraction, dedicated to the exhibition of filmmaking and set design.

=== Warner Bros. Studio Tour Hollywood ===
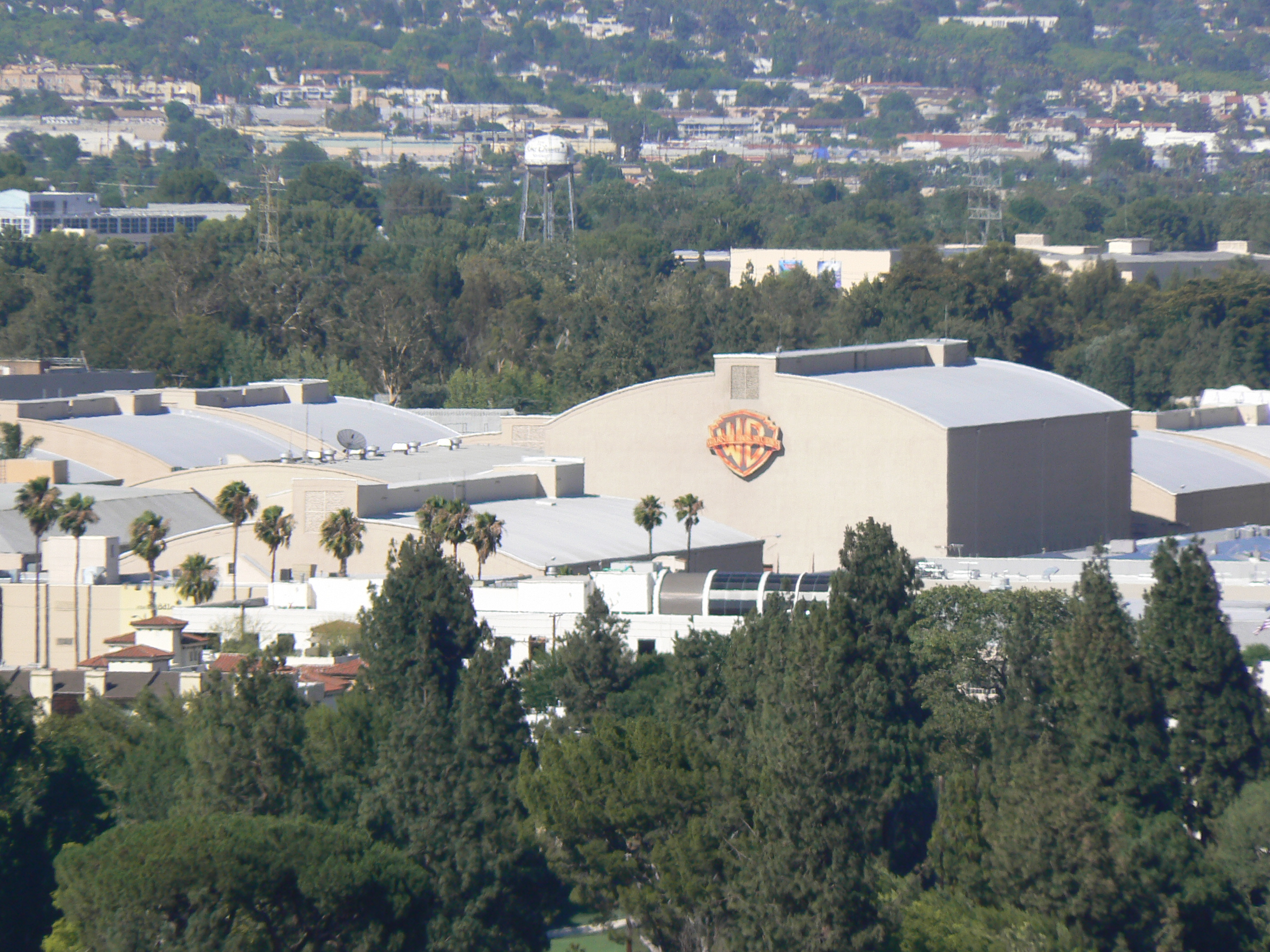
View of Warner Bros. Studios Burbank

Warner Bros. Studio Tour Hollywood is a public attraction situated inside Warner Bros. Studios Burbank in Burbank, California that offers visitors the chance to glimpse behind the scenes of one of the oldest and most popular film studios in the world.

Public tours have been running since 1972, but the attraction, previously known as the Warner Bros. Studios VIP Tour, officially adopted its current name, the Warner Bros. Studio Tour Hollywood, in 2015. This change was made to create a consistent global brand identity, following the success of the Warner Bros. Studio Tour London.

The backlot tour features iconic filming sites on Hennessy Street, the Jungle, Midwest Street, and the New York/Chicago Streets, showcasing sets from productions such as Gremlins, True Blood, ER, Friends, Gilmore Girls, Pretty Little Liars, and Shameless.

The Front Lot contains all of the sound stages. The Tour stops in a few stages including Stage 25 where they tape The Big Bang Theory, Stage 1 where they tape the Ellen Show and there are many other stages where they film including Conan, The Fosters, Lucifer, and The Real. The biggest stage on the Lot is Stage 16 where they filmed scenes from Dunkirk, The Perfect Storm and The Goonies. Stage 16 is also where Emma Stone and Ryan Gosling can be seen walking in the film La La Land. Also on the Front Lot is the Prop House with tons of artifacts and furniture from films and TV shows from the 1920s to today. Next to the prop house is the Batcave, where 10 Batmobiles are on display from several of the Batman Films. Jokers car from Suicide Squad is on display front and center.

At the end of the guided portion of the Tour, there is custom built soundstage called Stage 48. Inside this facility there is the real Central Perk set from Friends. Pictures can be taken on the orange sofa that the cast sat on during taping of the series. There are green screen photo opportunities where you can ride a Batpod through Gotham City or a Nimbus 2000 broom through Hogwarts and even play a game of Quidditch. There is even a working Central Perk Cafe that serves Central Perk branded coffee

The Warner Archive contains a displays of props and costumes in DC Universe: The Exhibit from Batman vs Superman: Dawn of Justice and Wonder Woman including Diana's training armour, Warrior Costume and even here Lasso and Sword. The Sword is set in the golden requiem. The upper levels have some of the original props and sets from the Harry Potter films including the costumes from Harry, Hermione and Ron. Fantastic Beasts and Where to Find Them is represented as well with Newt Scamander's suit and Jacob's apartment complete with the case of creatures and baked goods.

=== Warner Bros. Studio Tour London – The Making of Harry Potter ===
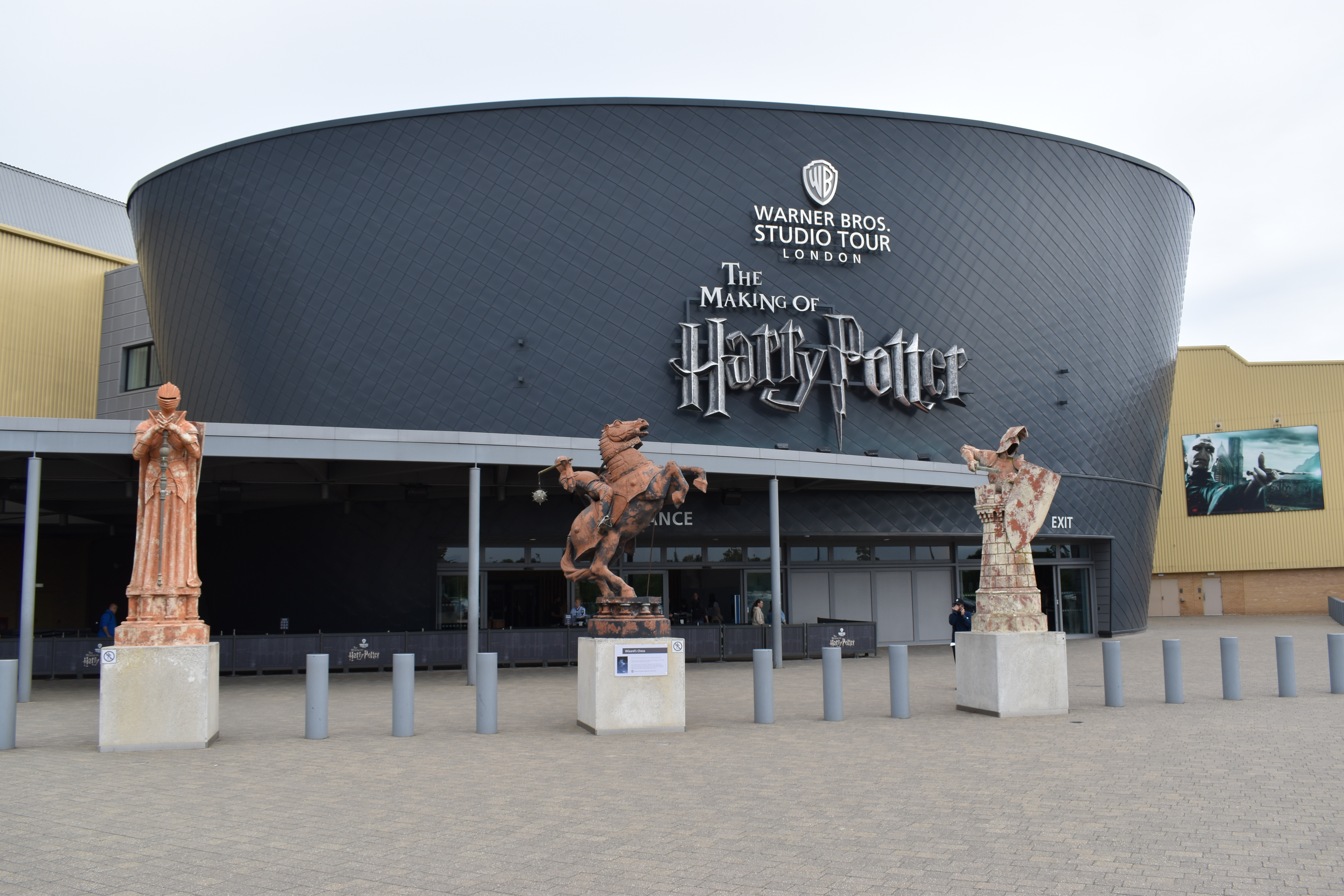
Entrance of Warner Bros. Studio Tour London

Warner Bros. Studio Tour London – The Making of Harry Potter is a walkthrough exhibition and studio tour in Leavesden, South East England. It is located within Warner Bros. Studios Leavesden, near Watford, in southwest Hertfordshire, and houses a permanent exhibit of authentic costumes, props and sets utilized in the production of the Harry Potter films, as well as behind-the-scenes production of visual effects. The tour is contained in Soundstages J and K, which were specially built for the attraction, and is separate from the studio's actual production facilities. It opened to the public in early 2012. The grand opening event was attended by many of the Harry Potter film series cast and crew members.

Each tour session typically lasts three and a half hours, and the tour has the capacity to handle 6,000 visitors daily. Despite Warner Bros. being the studio behind Harry Potter, the tour is not styled as a theme park due to the fact that Warner Bros. sold the license to do so to Universal Studios. Instead, visitors get a chance to see up close the detail and effort that goes into a major feature film at the scale of the Harry Potter series.

=== Warner Bros. Studio Tour Tokyo – The Making of Harry Potter ===
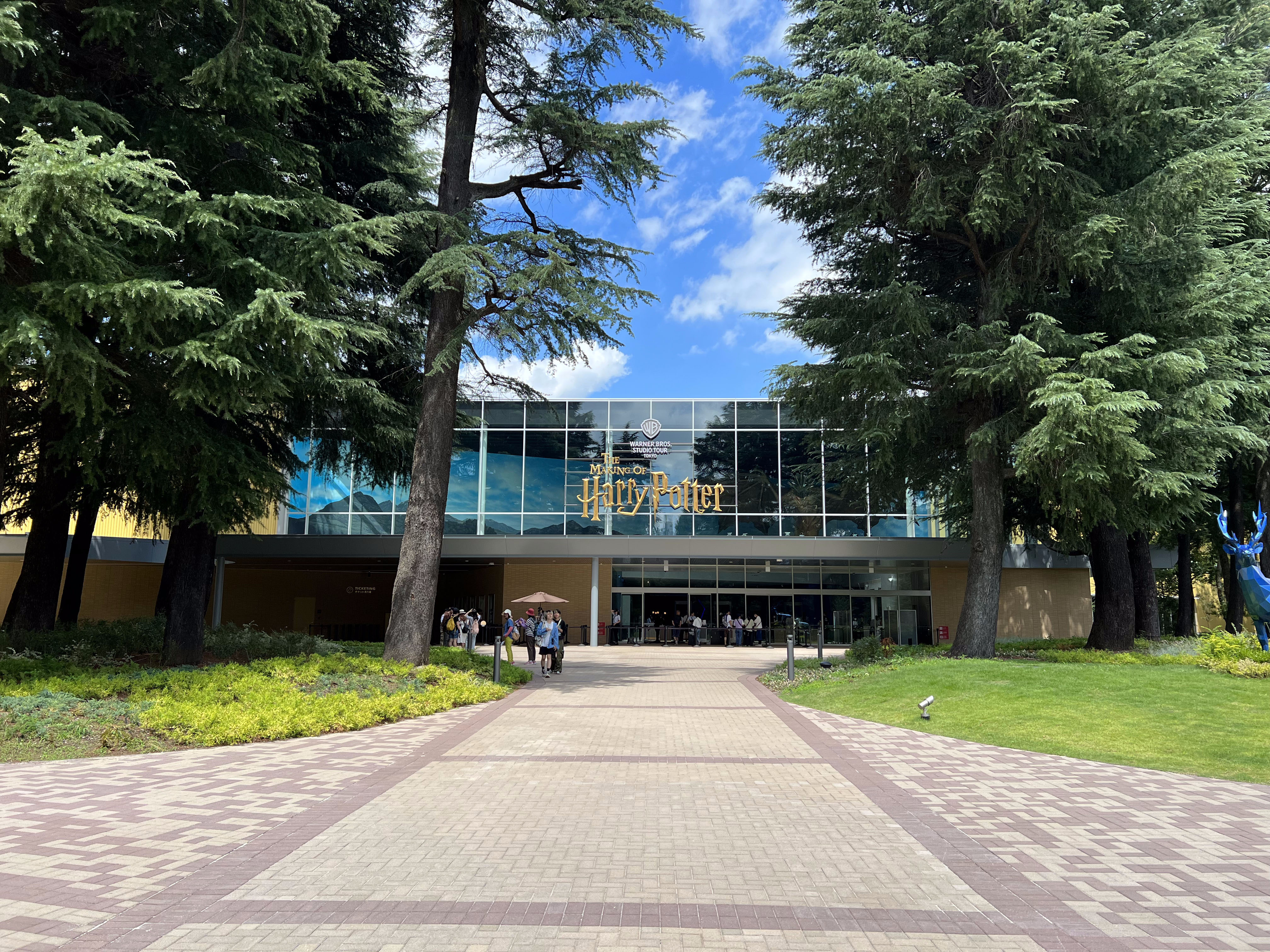
Entrance of Warner Bros. Studio Tour Tokyo

Announced in August 2020 and opened on June 16, 2023, Warner Bros. Studio Tour Tokyo – The Making of Harry Potter is an attraction in Tokyo, Japan. This is the second such park in the world, after the one in London, which opened in 2012.

It is located in the Tokyo Nerima Ward, on part of the now-defunct Toshimaen amusement park site. Similar to its counterpart in London, the 30,000 square-meter attraction in Tokyo offers visitors a walking tour through some of the recreated famous film sets including the Great Hall, the Forbidden Forest, and the Diagon Alley. It also displays film sets, costumes, and props that were used in the Harry Potter films. In addition to Harry Potter, it also covers the Fantastic Beasts spin-offs. Steam locomotive 4920 Dumbleton Hall is on exhibit, serving as the identical locomotive used in the Harry Potter movies.

=== Warner Bros. Studio Tour Shanghai – The Making of Harry Potter ===
Warner Bros. Discovery announced its intention to build a “Harry Potter Studio Tour” in Shanghai. The company is partnering with Jinjiang International, which made the news official on its WeChat account.

== See also ==
- Warner Bros. Studio Tour Hollywood
- Warner Bros. Studio Tour London – The Making of Harry Potter
- Warner Bros. Studio Tour Tokyo – The Making of Harry Potter
- Warner Bros. Studio Tour Shanghai – The Making of Harry Potter
