= Warner Bros. Studio Tour Hollywood =

Studio tour of the Warner Bros. Studios in Burbank

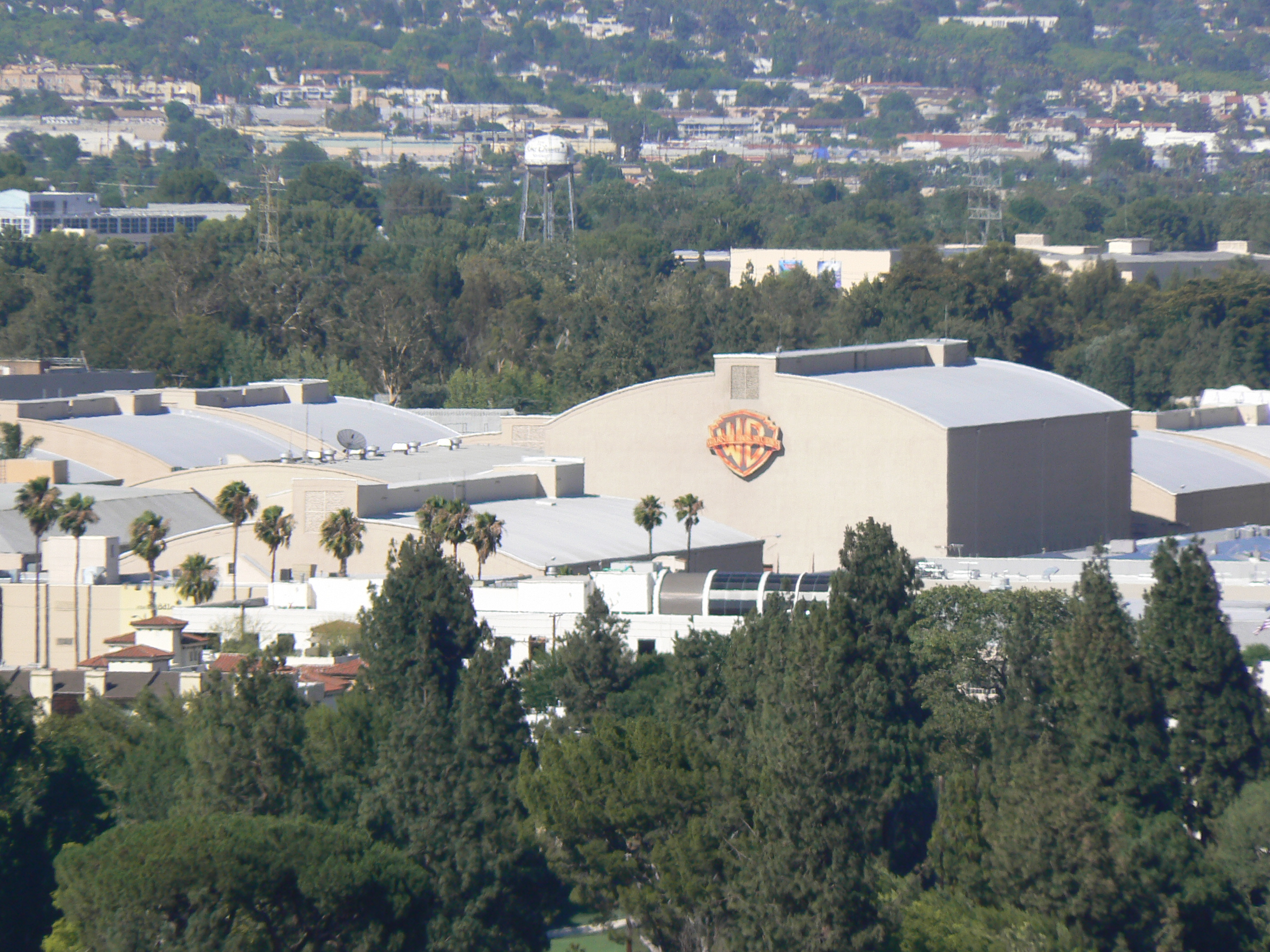
- View of the Warner Bros. Studios

Warner Bros. Studios Burbank
- Area: Soundstage (during non-active filming); Backlot; Archive; Picture Car Vault; Soundstage 48
- Status: Operating
- Opening date: 1972 (first public tours)

Ride statistics
- Attraction type: Guided and walkthrough studio tour
- Model: Film and television studio
- Duration: ~2-3 hours
- Operator: Warner Bros. Studio Tours
- Owner: Skydance Corporation (Warner Bros. Entertainment)
- Wheelchair accessible
- Assistive listening available
- Closed captioning available

Warner Bros. Studio Tour Hollywood is a guided walk-through tour of Warner Bros. Studios Burbank, located in Los Angeles, California. Over a two-to-three-hour period, visitors can glimpse behind the scenes of one of the oldest film studios in the world.

The studio tour has been open for several decades, but it was renamed Warner Bros. Studio Tours to provide a more uniform identity following the success of Warner Bros. Studio Tour London - The Making of Harry Potter at Warner Bros. Studios Leavesden. Previously, it was known as the Warner Bros. Studios VIP Tour. There are three types of Warner Bros. Studio tours: (1) first tour - they used to show the studio to friends and special guests, which was delivered by employees; (2) public tour - after encountering financial difficulties in 1972, Warner Bros. began to provide a tour for the general public; (3) VIP studio tour - this tour was generally provided for celebrities.

== History ==
=== First tours ===
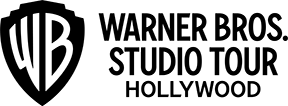
Another version of Warner Bros. Studio Tour Hollywood logo used primarily from 2019 to 2023. This logo is still used for some properties

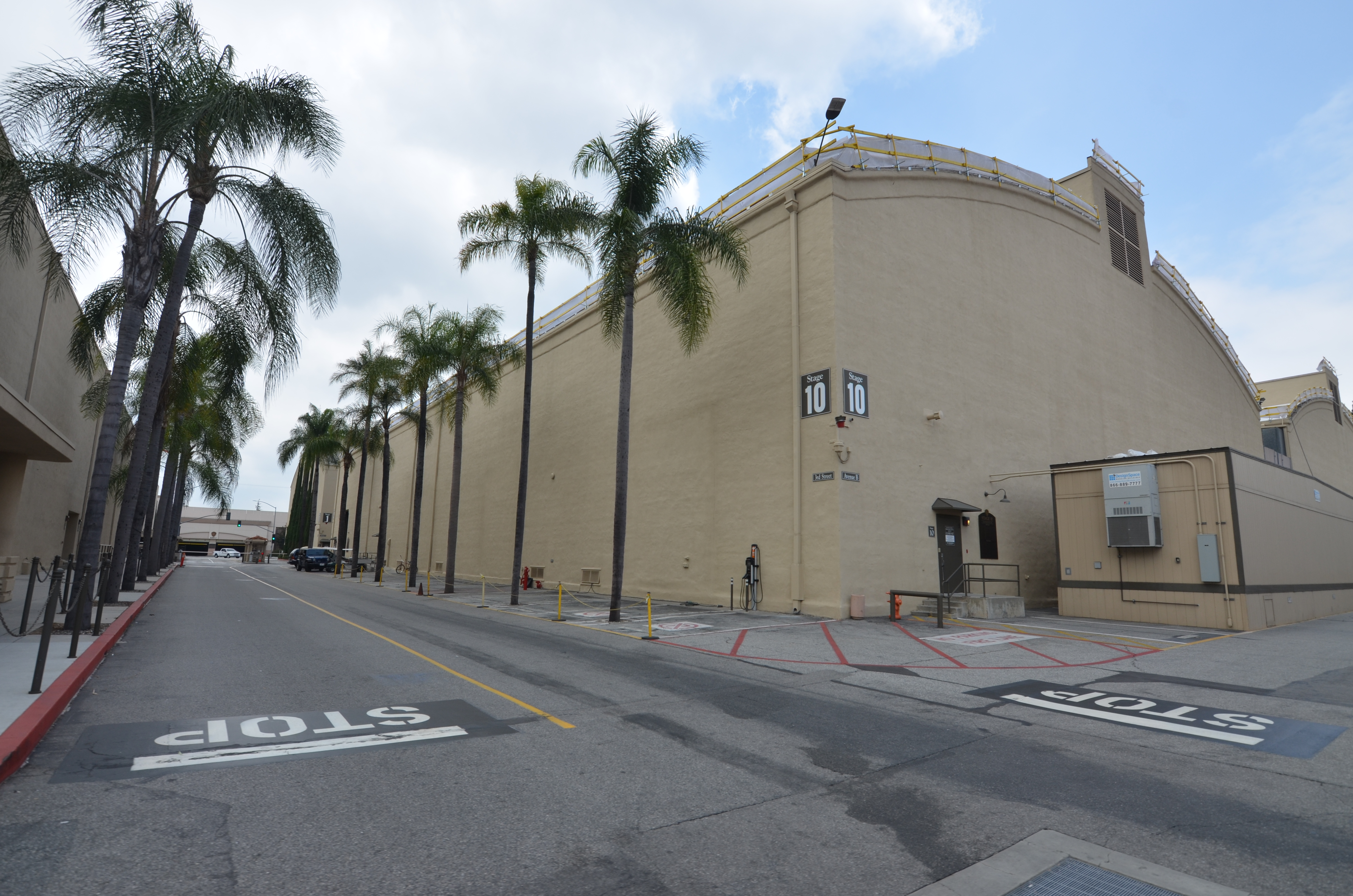
Stages of the Warner Bros. Studios

In the early days of Warner Bros., Jack Warner provided tours to welcome friends and special guests to the studio. If Warner could not give the tour himself, mail room employees were entrusted to show guests around the lot. These tours were not offered to the public and could only be arranged through employees; however, they still proved popular. Consequently, Warner sought to limit requests as he thought studio tours could cause a "slow-up" of the company's operations.

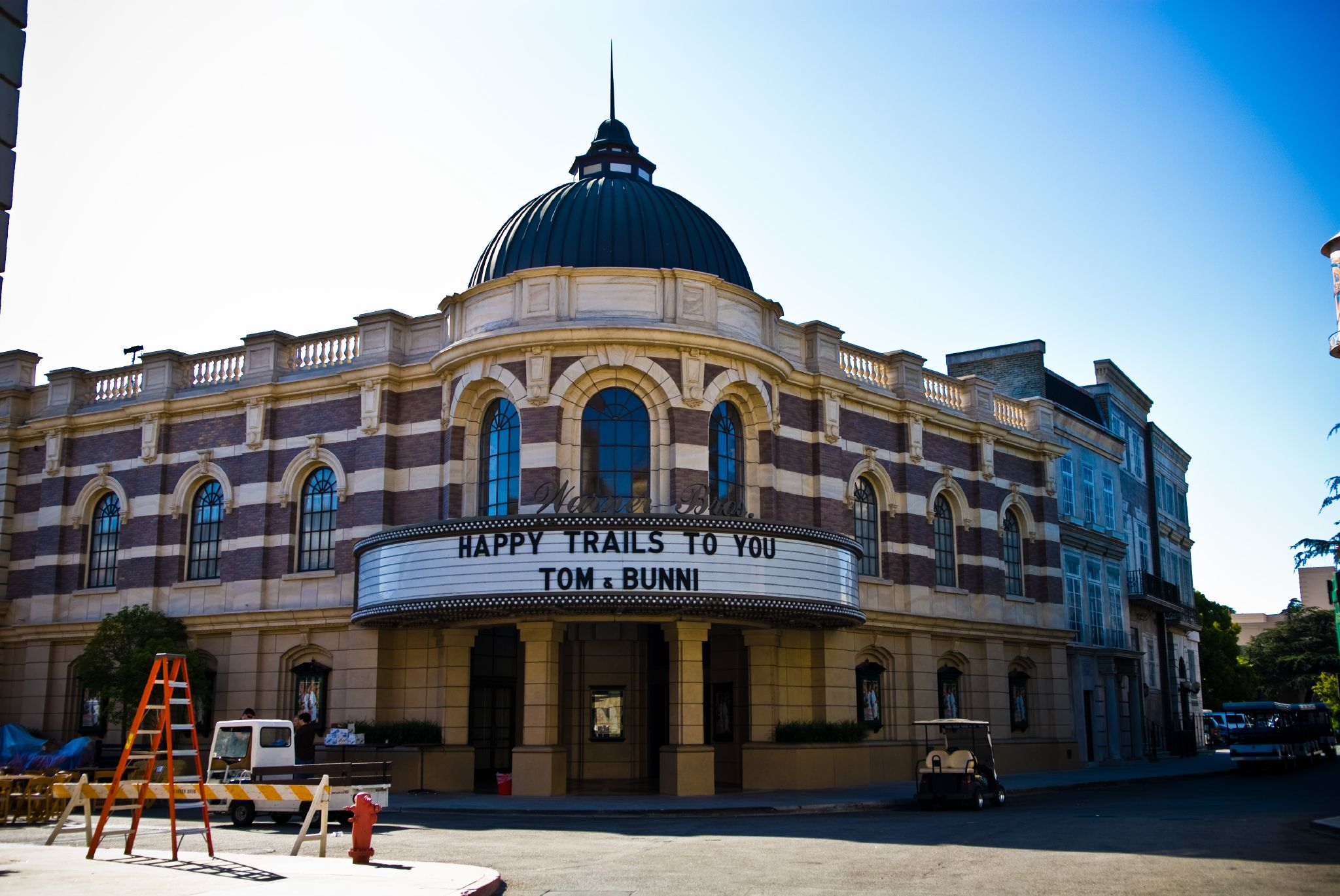
Steven J. Ross Theater of the Warner Bros. Studios

One mail room employee, Dick Mason, was noted for giving informative tours and was frequently the requested guide for studio executives' guests. Mason's knowledge led him to be assigned to Jack Warner's office to assist the Vice President of Worldwide Production.

=== Public tours ===
In 1972, Warner Bros. faced financial hardships and signed a deal with Columbia Pictures, which was also struggling. They combined to create The Burbank Studios, a joint venture in which they shared studio space. In 1973, the new company opened a public-facing Tour Department. Dick Mason was assigned to manage the new operation. All tours required an advanced reservation and cost $3.

Mason's department included seven tour guides, and tours were limited to twelve people at a time. Tours were unscripted but included the back lot sets, sound stages, and prop house, depending on availability. Without a budget for advertising, news spread by word-of-mouth. The tour proved popular due to its unscripted nature and saw 15,000 guests a year.

As compared to the Universal tour, Dick Mason was interested in educating the public about film making: "The entire tour is practical. There are no demonstrations or simulations. We're catering to families and kids. We just want to give insight to a business most people have misunderstandings about." The tours departed about four times a day and were around three hours.

In 1990, The Burbank Studios dissolved, and Warner Bros. reclaimed the rest of the studio from Columbia Pictures when Columbia moved to the former Metro-Goldwyn-Mayer lot in Culver City. The Tour Department was relocated into a building next to the studio's Gate 4 on Hollywood Way, allowing the public to inquire about the tour without needing a pass and also shared the space with a Studio Store.

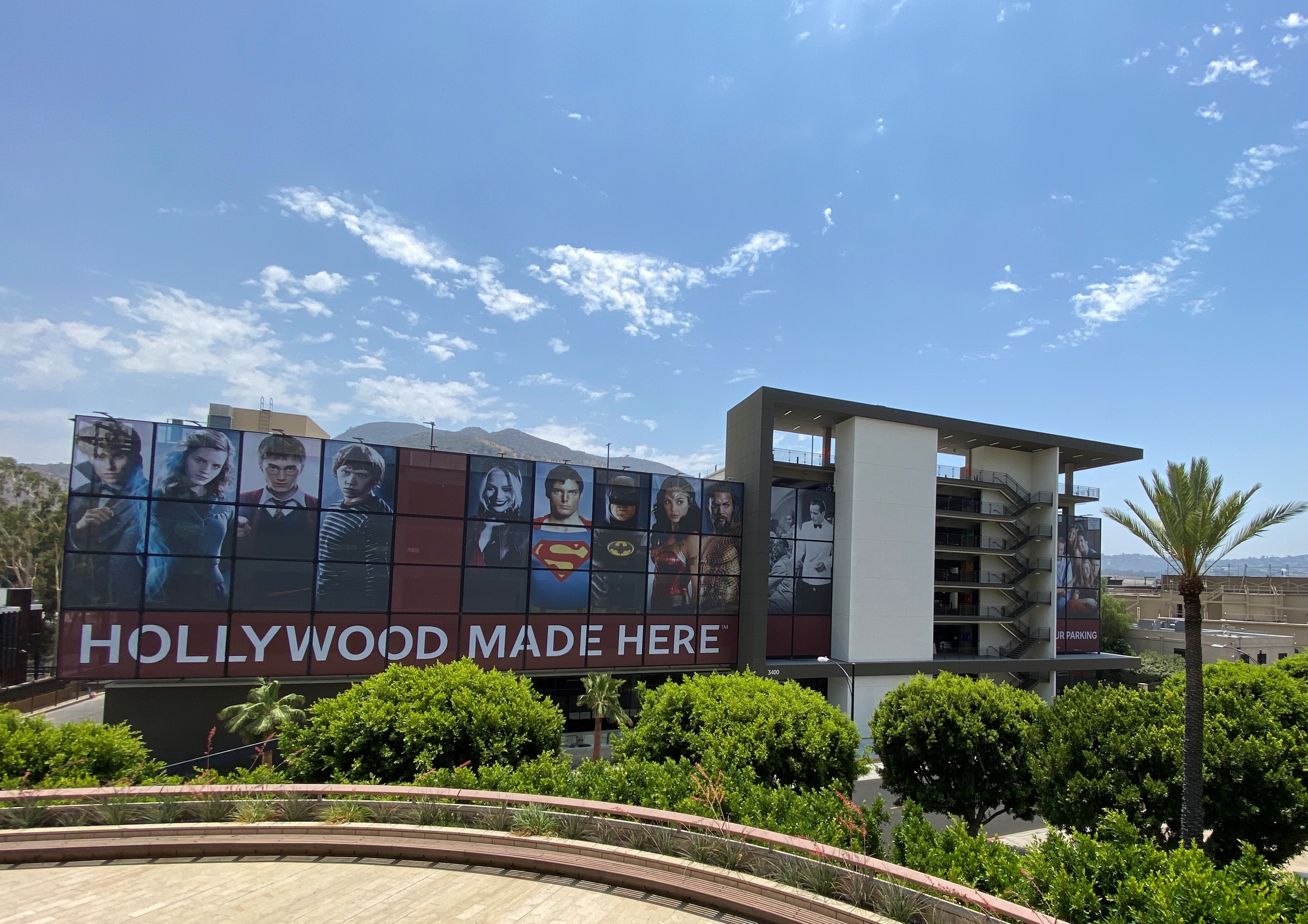
Warner Bros. Studio Tour center and parking structure that opened in July 2021.

=== VIP Studio Tours ===
Dick Mason retired from Warner Bros. in 2000, and Danny Kahn assumed leadership of the Tour Department. Kahn moved the location of the tour to an office building previously occupied by Columbia Pictures across the street from Gate 5. He increased the frequency of tours but retained the small group sizes and unscripted nature. The tour became more streamlined and began more aggressive advertising.

=== Warner Bros. Studio Tour Hollywood ===
In 2015, the tour re-branded itself with the launch of Stage 48: Script to Screen. The expanded tour uses a new name, a new logo, and newer tour carts.

== Current Experience ==
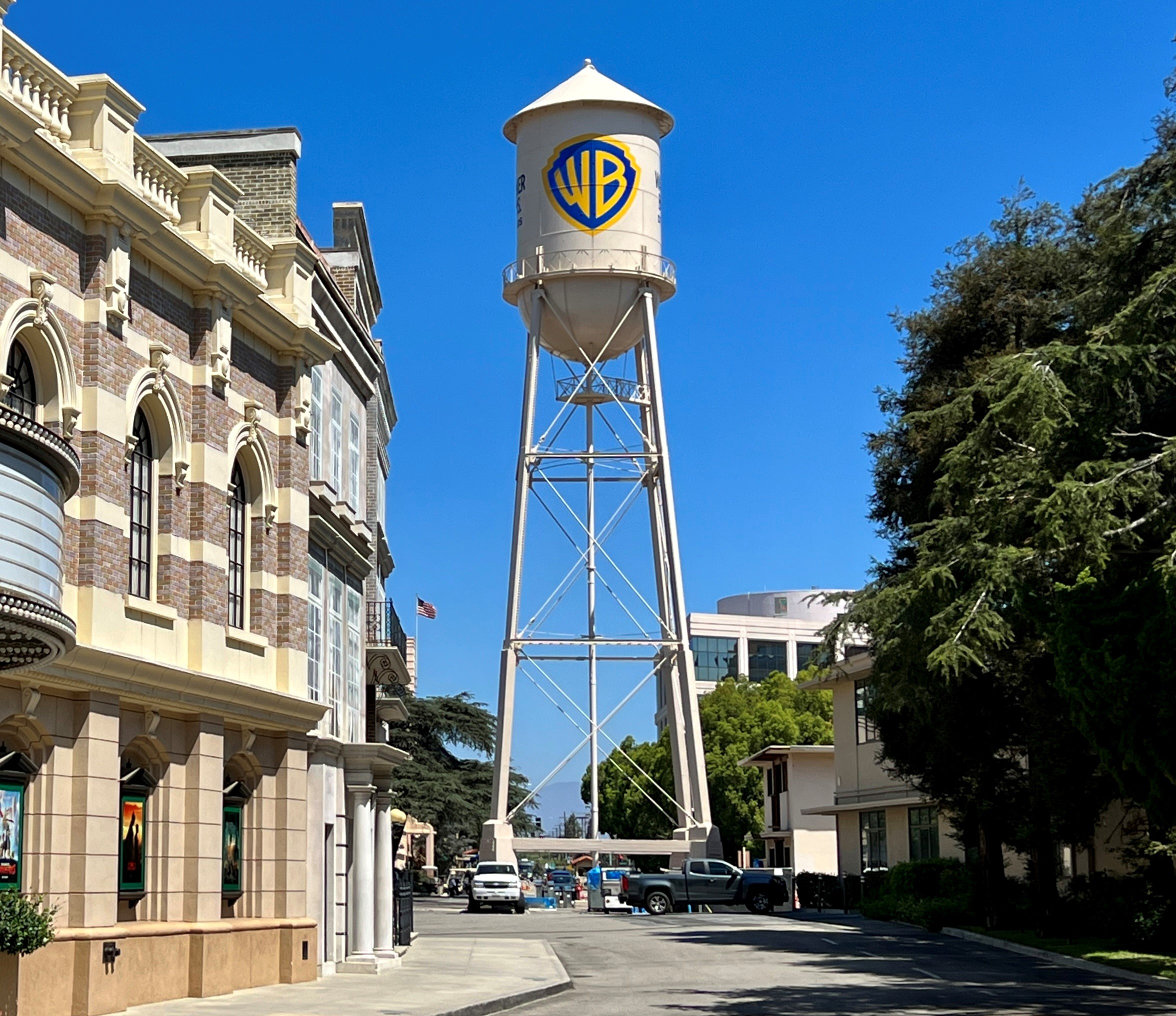
Warner Bros. Studio water tower

There are four tours currently available: the standard Studio Tour, which lasts 3 hours (1 hour guided and 2 hours self-guided); the TCM Classic Films tour, which lasts 3 1/2 hours (1 1/2 hour guided and 2 hours self-guided) with a focus on the Golden Age of Hollywood; the Studio Tour Plus, lasting 4 hours (2 hours guided); and the Deluxe Tour which lasts 6 hours (3 hours guided, 1-hour fine dining lunch, and 2 hours self-guided). The Warner Bros. lot is an active filming location, and each tour differs due to filming.

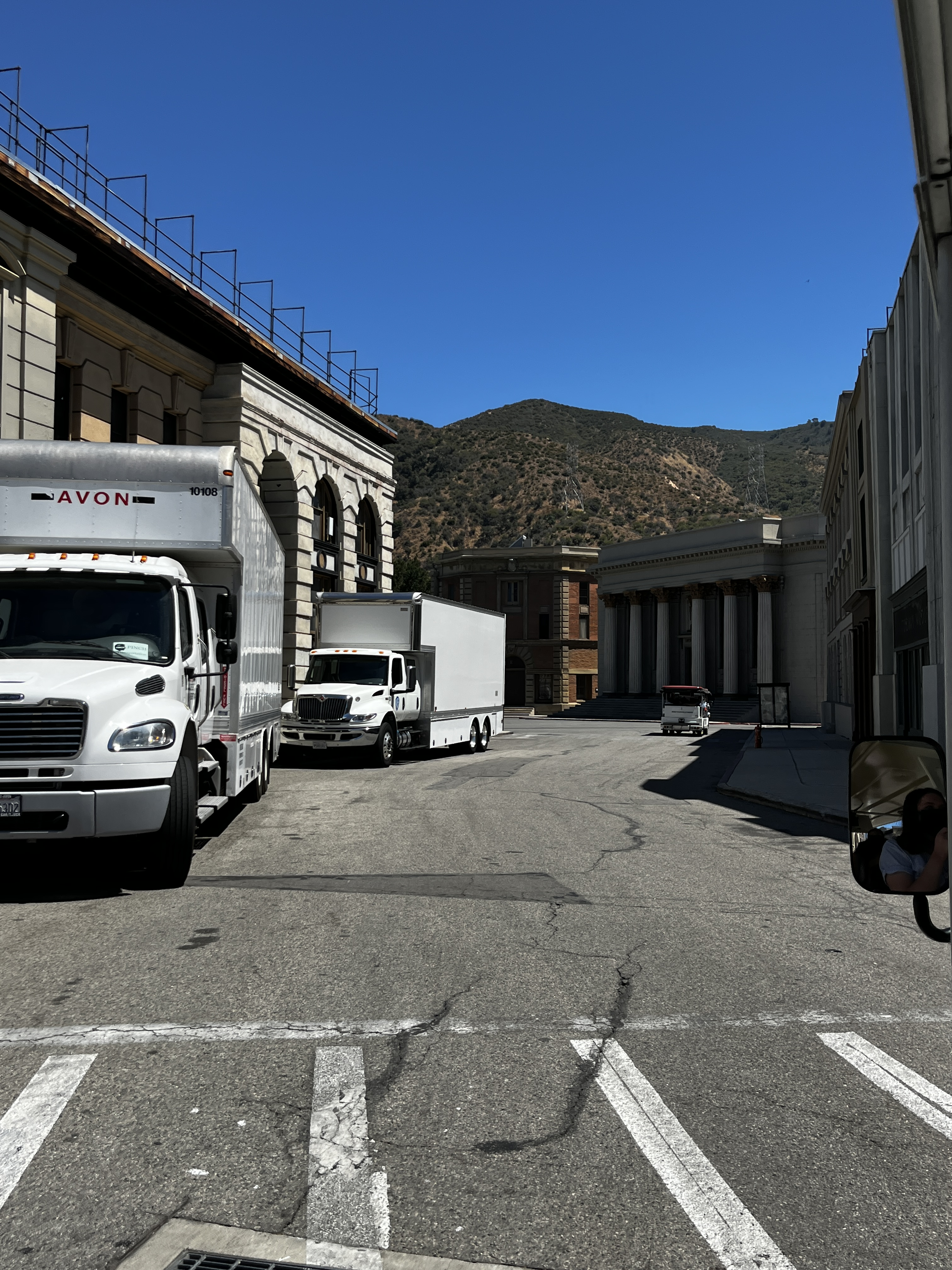
View of the back lot Warner Bros. Studios scenery from the tour bus

The locations below are featured in every Studio Tour. The upgraded Studio Tour Plus offers extra stops such as a continental breakfast, lunch at the Central Perk Café, and a visit to the Property Department. The Deluxe Tour provides extended time at each of these locations, plus added attractions: a continental breakfast, lunch at Warner Bros. Fine Dining, as well as tours of the Property Department and the Costume Department.

- Soundstage - All tours try to include a visit inside at least one stage of the current production that is not actively filming.
- The Backlot - A series of outdoor sets representing various locations such as New York, a mid-western town, and a jungle.
- Stage 48: Script to Screen - An interactive soundstage that takes guests through the production process. The soundstage opened on July 16, 2015. Stage 48 is self-guided and includes the original set of Central Perk from the television show Friends where guests can take pictures on the couch. There is also a green screen video opportunity where guests can fly on a broomstick from Harry Potter or ride on a Batpod as seen in The Dark Knight. The couch from The Big Bang Theory is also available to sit on and take a photo. In addition to the attraction, the building includes a café and coffee shop themed "Central Perk" from Friends as well as a Friends-themed gift shop.
- The new grand finale that opened in July 2021, “Action and Magic Made Here,” allows guests to interact with props, costumes, and recreated sets from the Wizarding World of Harry Potter and Fantastic Beasts as well as the DC Universe. In a recreated Great Hall set, visitors can wear the Sorting Hat and hear the hat shout out the Hogwarts house where you truly belong.

== Former Special exhibits ==
- Batman 75th Anniversary - A special display that opened on June 26, 2014, in both the Archive and the Picture Car Vault. In the Archive, there were displays of props and costumes from every Warner Bros. Batman movie. Batmobiles and other Batman vehicles were put on display in the Picture Car Vault. Beginning in September 2015, the Batmobile from the movie Batman v Superman: Dawn of Justice joined the display when not used for filming.
- Horror Made Here - Opened for Halloween in Stage 48, the temporary exhibit included assets from The Exorcist, Interview with the Vampire, Annabelle, and other horror movies.
- "Mad Max: Fury Road" Costumes - Added to Stage 48 on February 24, 2016.
- DC Universe: The Exhibit - Located in The Archive, this exhibit replaced portions of the Batman 75th Anniversary display. The Exhibit includes the first issues of comic books such as Superman, Batman, and Wonder Woman as well as props and costumes from the films Batman vs. Superman and Suicide Squad.
- DC Universe: The Exhibit was updated to include the latest costumes and props from Wonder Woman 2017
- The Cafe that Mia worked in from the Oscar Winning film La La Land has been dressed as seen in the production as part of a stop on the tour.
- Stage 48 has been updated to include a look at props and costumes from all 7 years of the TV series Pretty Little Liars.

=== Horror Made Here: A Festival of Frights ===
In 2018, this special event featured dark mazes and attractions based on films and video games:

- It Knows What Scares You; A dark maze based on New Line Cinema’s 2017 film, It.
- Joker's Arkham Asylum; A dark maze based on WB Games' Batman: Arkham Asylum.
- The Conjuring Universe; A dark maze based on New Line Cinema's The Conjuring franchise.
- Nightmare on Camp Crystal Lake; A dark maze based on New Line Cinema's Friday the 13th and A Nightmare on Elm Street franchises.
- The Exorcist: Forbidden Screening; A 4D theater attraction based on the 1973 film, The Exorcist.

== See also ==
- Warner Bros. Studio Tour Tokyo – The Making of Harry Potter
- Warner Bros. Studio Tour Shanghai – The Making of Harry Potter
- Universal Studios Hollywood
- Universal Studio Tour
