= The Wizarding World of Harry Potter =

Harry Potter-themed land at Universal theme parks

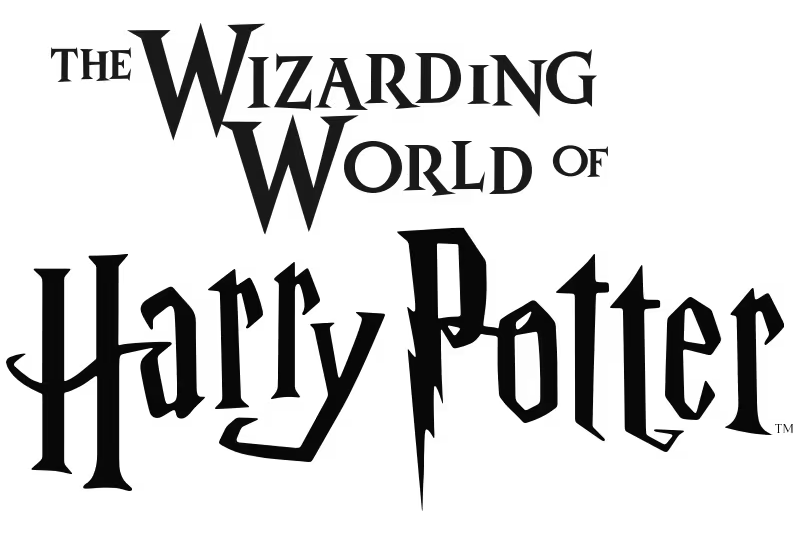
- Plain logo

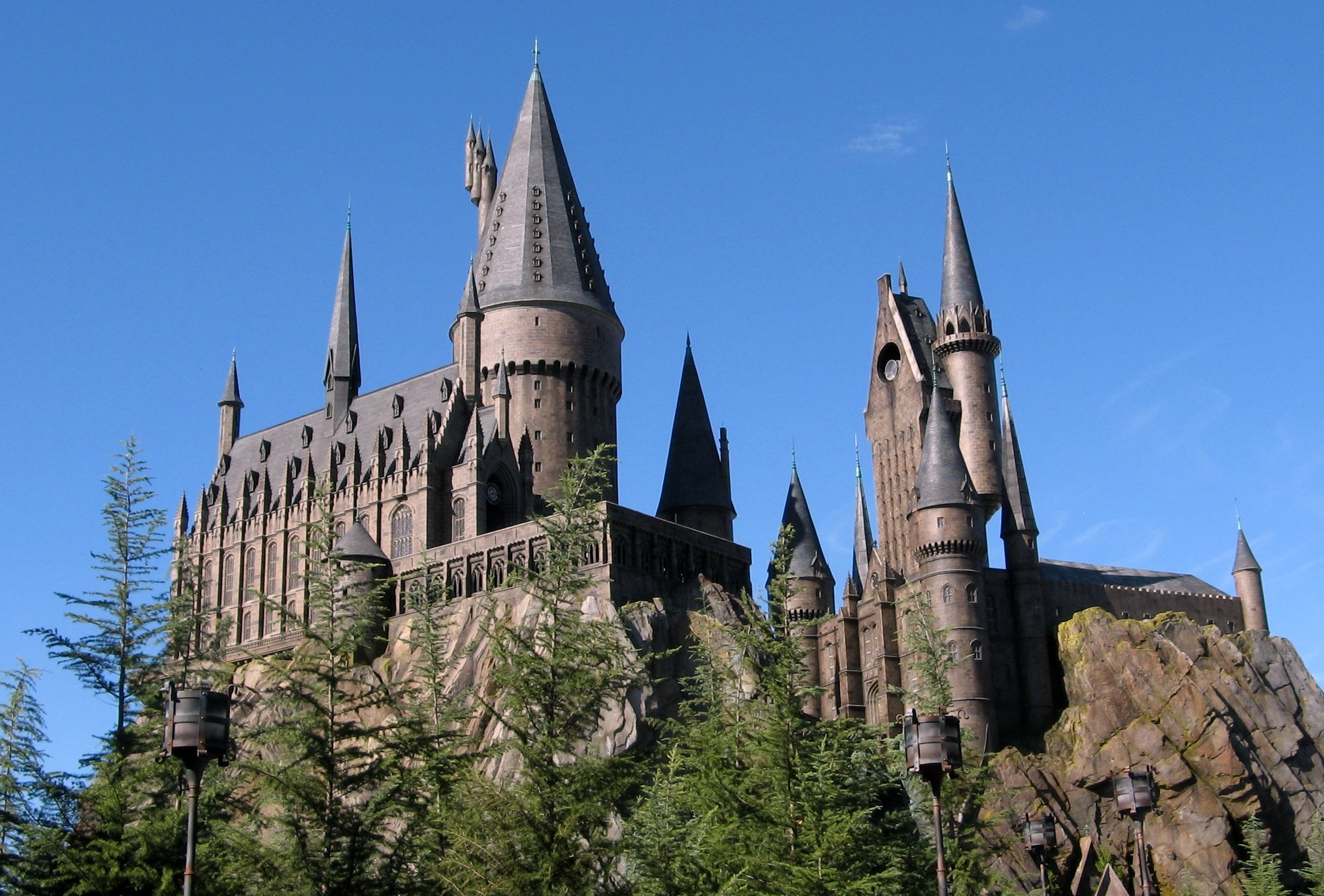
- Hogwarts Castle, which houses Harry Potter and the Forbidden Journey
- Theme: Harry Potter (book series, film series and universe)

Attractions
- Total: 3 (Florida); 3 (Japan, Hollywood, Beijing)
- Roller coasters: 3 (Florida); 1 (Japan, Hollywood, Beijing)
- Shows: 4 (Florida); 2 (Japan, Hollywood, Beijing)

Universal Islands of Adventure
- Status: Operating
- Opened: June 18, 2010
- Replaced: Portions of The Lost Continent

Universal Studios Florida
- Status: Operating
- Opened: July 8, 2014
- Replaced: Amity Island

Universal Studios Japan
- Status: Operating
- Opened: July 15, 2014

Universal Studios Hollywood
- Status: Operating
- Opened: April 7, 2016
- Replaced: Gibson Amphitheatre; The Adventures of Curious George

Universal Studios Beijing
- Status: Operating
- Opened: September 20, 2021

Universal Epic Universe
- Status: Operating
- Opened: May 22, 2025

The Wizarding World of Harry Potter is a collection of themed areas at Universal Destinations & Experiences based on the Harry Potter media franchise, adapting elements from the Warner Bros.' film series and original novels by J. K. Rowling. The areas were designed by Universal Creative from an exclusive license with Warner Bros. Entertainment.

== Background ==
A Harry Potter-themed attraction at either a Disney or Universal park was rumored in 2003. However, the rights to the Harry Potter franchise had been acquired by Warner Bros., who denied all rumors. Both Disney and Universal entered bidding negotiations with Warner Bros. and Rowling for the theme park rights to Harry Potter. In 2004, sources reported that Rowling was considering a deal with Disney, with the company intending to develop a Harry Potter section within an area of Fantasyland at the Magic Kingdom park at Walt Disney World. In January 2007, About.com reported a rumor from a "highly credible source" that the Universal Islands of Adventure park's Merlinwood section of the Lost Continent area was going to be re-themed "to the stories and characters of one of the most popular children's franchises". Other sources followed up in the next few days with unofficial confirmation that the new area would involve Harry Potter. On May 31, 2007, Universal, in partnership with Warner Bros., officially announced the Wizarding World of Harry Potter would be added to Islands of Adventure.

== Parks ==
=== Universal Orlando Resort ===
All three theme parks at the Universal Orlando Resort in Orlando, Florida – Universal Islands of Adventure, Universal Studios Florida and Universal Epic Universe – have Wizarding World of Harry Potter themed environments. The two formers include Hogwarts Express stations allowing passengers to reach both theme parks aboard the full-scale replica of the train that appears in the film series.

==== Universal Islands of Adventure ====
The Wizarding World of Harry Potter opened at Universal Islands of Adventure on June 18, 2010. It includes a re-creation of Hogsmeade and three rides. The flagship attraction is Harry Potter and the Forbidden Journey, which exists within a re-creation of Hogwarts School of Witchcraft and Wizardry. A new roller coaster, Hagrid's Magical Creatures Motorbike Adventure, which replaced the Dragon Challenge, opened on June 13, 2019. Other rides include Flight of the Hippogriff, a family roller coaster, and the Hogwarts Express. Other attractions include Ollivanders Wand Shop, the Triwizard Spirit Rally, and the Frog Choir. Hogsmeade contains many gift shops and restaurants from the book series including Dervish and Banges, Honeydukes, Ollivanders, the Three Broomsticks, and the Hog's Head.

==== Universal Studios Florida ====
At the Universal Studios Florida theme park, another Wizarding World of Harry Potter land opened on July 8, 2014. It includes a re-creation of Diagon Alley and connecting alleys, as well as a small section of Muggle London. It includes the rides Harry Potter and the Escape from Gringotts and the Hogwarts Express. Other attractions include Ollivanders Wand Shop, a puppet performance of The Tales of Beedle the Bard, and a live performance by Celestina Warbeck and the Banshees. The area also contains many shops and restaurants from the book series including The Leaky Cauldron, Ollivanders Wand Shop, Weasleys' Wizard Wheezes, Borgin and Burkes, Madam Malkin's Robes for All Occasions, Wiseacre's Wizarding Equipment, and Florean Fortescue's Ice Cream Parlour.

==== Universal Epic Universe ====
A third land in the Wizarding World, the Ministry of Magic, opened as part of Universal Epic Universe on May 22, 2025 with attractions based on both the Harry Potter and Fantastic Beasts film series. A theatrical show Le Cirque Arcanus is included in 1920s wizarding Paris. The land also features many shops, restaurants, and experiences, as well as a location where guests can time travel by Métro-Floo to the 1990s British Ministry of Magic. The sole ride in the Ministry of Magic land is Harry Potter and the Battle at the Ministry.

Cosme Acajor Baguettes Magique sells character wands that can be used throughout all three Wizarding World of Harry Potter themed environments at Universal Orlando Resort, along with an exclusive line of wands unique to Cosme Acajor Baguettes Magique.

=== Universal Studios Japan ===
At the Universal Studios Japan theme park in Osaka, Japan, the Wizarding World of Harry Potter opened on July 15, 2014. It includes the village of Hogsmeade, Harry Potter and the Forbidden Journey ride, and Flight of the Hippogriff roller coaster. Two features in the Japanese park not found in Orlando or Hollywood is Hogwarts' Black Lake. From 2014 to 2018, the land also featured two live great horned owls tied to a pedestal, but this has been discontinued.

=== Universal Studios Hollywood ===
The Wizarding World of Harry Potter opened at Universal Studios Hollywood on April 7, 2016, Replacing The Adventures of Curious George which closed on September 6, 2013. The flagship attraction is the flight-simulating ride Harry Potter and the Forbidden Journey, similar to the Orlando one. Visitors once wore Quidditch-inspired 3D goggles throughout the ride for an enhanced ride experience, but the 3D visuals have recently been replaced by 2D.

=== Universal Studios Beijing ===
The Wizarding World of Harry Potter opened as part of Universal Studios Beijing on September 20, 2021. This area features the familiar village of Hogsmeade and the towering Hogwarts Castle. The main attraction is the Harry Potter and the Forbidden Journey flight-simulating ride, which is similar to the version in other Universal parks. Another notable ride is the family-friendly coaster, Flight of the Hippogriff. Visitors can also experience the wand-choosing show at Ollivanders and enjoy dining at the Three Broomsticks.

== Attractions ==
The table below shows the different attractions across all the parks around the world.

Name	Type of Attraction	Locations
Flight of the Hippogriff	Ride	Orlando, Hollywood, Japan, Beijing
Hagrid's Magical Creature Motorbike Adventure	Ride	Orlando
Harry Potter and the Escape from Gringotts	Ride	Orlando
Harry Potter and the Forbidden Journey	Ride	Orlando, Hollywood, Japan, Beijing
Hogwarts Express - Hogsmeade Station	Ride	Orlando
Hogwarts Express - King's Cross Station	Ride	Orlando
Dragon Challenge	Ride	Orlando
Harry Potter and the Battle at the Ministry	Ride	Orlando
Celestina Warbeck and the Banshees	Show	Orlando
Frog Choir	Show	Orlando, Japan, Beijing
Knight Bus	Show	Orlando
Ollivanders Experience in Diagon Alley	Show	Orlando
Ollivanders Experience in Hogsmeade	Show	Orlando, Hollywood, Japan, Beijing
The Nighttime Lights at Hogwarts Castle	Show	Orlando (2018–2023), Hollywood
Dark Arts at Hogwarts Castle	Show	Orlando, Hollywood
The Magic of Christmas at Hogwarts Castle	Show	Orlando, Hollywood
Dementor Attack	Show	Japan
The Tales of Beedle the Bard	Show	Orlando
Triwizard Spirit Rally	Show	Orlando, Japan
Wand Studies	Show	Japan
Hogwarts Always	Show	Orlando
Le Cirque Arcanus	Show	Orlando
Florean Fortescue's Ice-Cream Parlour	Dining	Orlando
Hog's Head	Dining	Orlando, Hollywood, Japan, Beijing
Leaky Cauldron	Dining	Orlando
The Fountain of Fair Fortune	Dining	Orlando
The Hopping Pot	Dining	Orlando
Three Broomsticks	Dining	Orlando, Hollywood, Japan, Beijing
Café L'air De la Sirène	Dining	Orlando
Borgin and Burkes	Shops	Orlando
Dervish and Banges	Shops	Orlando, Hollywood, Japan, Beijing
Filch's Emporium of Confiscated Goods	Shops	Orlando, Hollywood, Japan, Beijing
Gringotts Money Exchange	Shops	Orlando
Honeydukes	Shops	Orlando, Hollywood, Japan, Beijing
Madam Malkin's Robes for All Occasions	Shops	Orlando
Ollivanders Wand Shop in Diagon Alley	Shops	Orlando
Ollivanders Wand Shop in Hogsmeade	Shops	Orlando, Hollywood, Japan, Beijing
Owl Post & Owlery	Shops	Orlando, Hollywood, Japan, Beijing
Quality Quidditch Supplies	Shops	Orlando
Scribbulus	Shops	Orlando
Shutterbutton's Photography Studio	Shops	Orlando
Sugarplum's Sweetshop	Shops	Orlando
Wands by Gregorovitch	Shops	Orlando
Weasley's Wizard Wheezes	Shops	Orlando
Wiseacre's Wizarding Equipment	Shops	Orlando, Hollywood, Japan, Beijing
Gladrags Wizardwear	Shops	Orlando, Hollywood, Japan, Beijing
Zonko's Joke Shop	Shops	Orlando, Hollywood, Japan, Beijing
Hogsmeade Station	Shops	Beijing
Cosme Acajor Baguettes Magiques	Shops	Orlando

== See also ==
- Places in Harry Potter
