= Flight of the Hippogriff =

Junior roller coaster at Universal parks

- Previously known as Flying Unicorn (2000–2008)
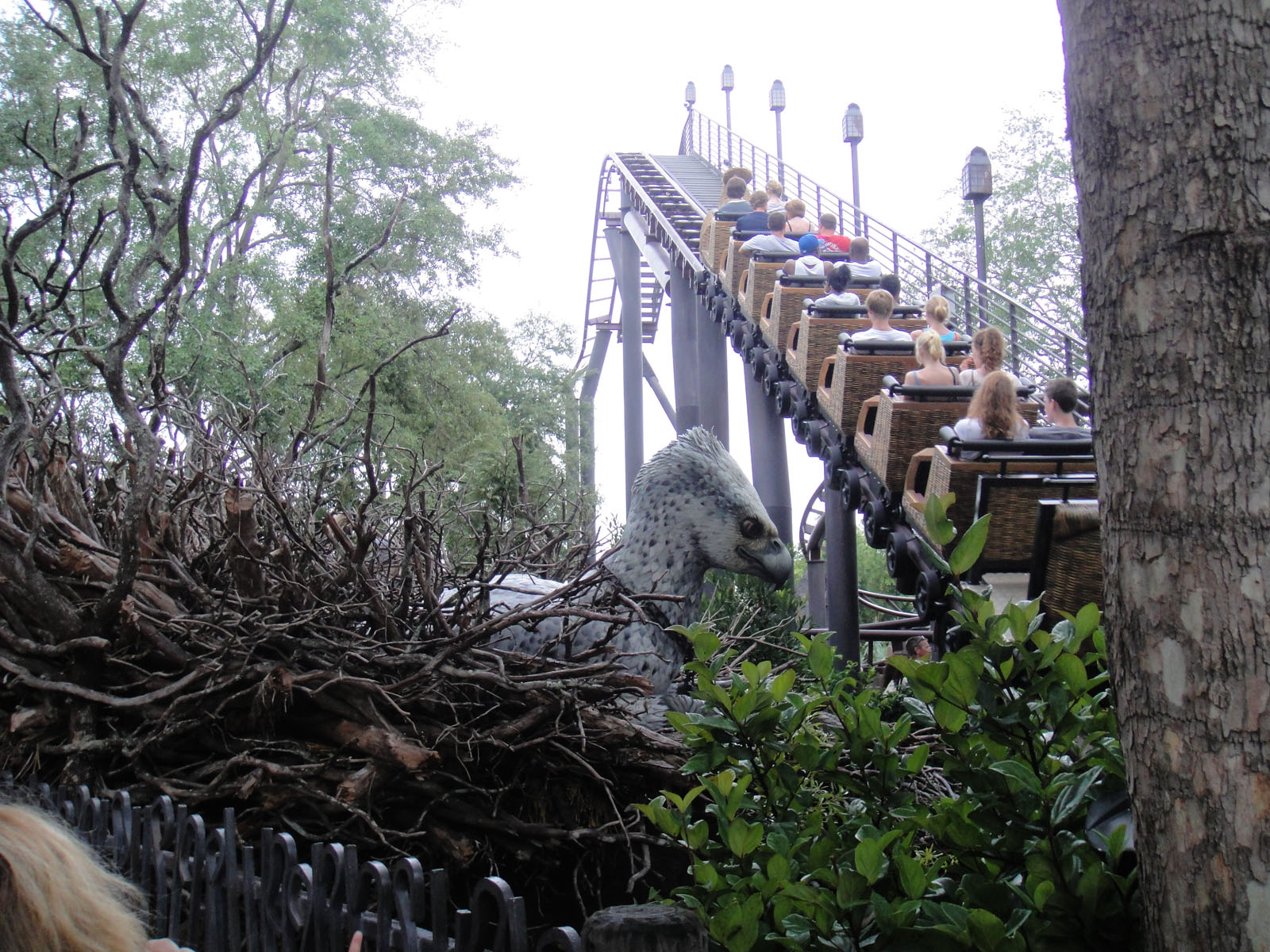
- A vehicle ascending the lift hill on Flight of the Hippogriff. An animatronic Hippogriff can be seen in the background, to the left side of the lift hill.

Universal Islands of Adventure
- Park section: The Wizarding World of Harry Potter - Hogsmeade
- Coordinates: 28.472454°N 81.473803°W
- Status: Operating
- Opening date: June 29, 2000
- Flight of the Hippogriff at Universal Islands of Adventure at RCDB

Universal Studios Japan
- Park section: The Wizarding World of Harry Potter
- Coordinates: 34.6685°N 135.4321°E
- Status: Operating
- Opening date: July 15, 2014
- Flight of the Hippogriff at Universal Studios Japan at RCDB

Universal Studios Hollywood
- Park section: The Wizarding World of Harry Potter
- Coordinates: 34.1377°N 118.3537°W
- Status: Operating
- Opening date: April 7, 2016
- Flight of the Hippogriff at Universal Studios Hollywood at RCDB

Universal Studios Beijing
- Park section: The Wizarding World of Harry Potter
- Coordinates: 39.855°N 116.674°E
- Status: Operating
- Opening date: September 20, 2021
- Flight of the Hippogriff at Universal Studios Beijing at RCDB

General statistics
- Type: Steel – Junior
- Manufacturer: Vekoma (Orlando, Japan); Mack Rides (Hollywood, Beijing)
- Designer: Universal Creative
- Model: Junior Coaster (335m) (Japan/Florida); Youngstar Coaster (Custom) (Hollywood, Beijing)
- Lift/launch system: Drive tire (Florida, Hollywood, Japan); Chain (Beijing)
- Height: 42.7 ft (13.0 m)
- Length: 1,099.1 ft (335.0 m)
- Speed: 28.5 mph (45.9 km/h)
- Inversions: 0
- Duration: 1:06
- Height restriction: 36 in (91 cm)
- Trains: 2 trains with 8 cars; riders arranged 2 across in a single row for a total of 16 riders per train
- Queue host: Rubeus Hagrid (voiced by Robbie Coltrane)
- Ride host: Rubeus Hagrid
- Universal Express available
- Must transfer from wheelchair

Flight of the Hippogriff is a junior roller coaster at the Wizarding World of Harry Potter section of the many Universal theme parks. It is present at Universal Islands of Adventure in Universal Orlando Resort, Universal Studios Japan, Universal Studios Hollywood and Universal Studios Beijing. Designed by Universal Creative, the first installation opened at Islands of Adventure on June 18, 2010. The new ride was a redesign of an existing roller coaster known as Flying Unicorn, which the park closed in 2008 to begin its transformation. The design change was implemented to fit the new Harry Potter-themed area that was being constructed at the park. Flight of the Hippogriff is a mild alternative to the area's more extreme rides such as Harry Potter and the Forbidden Journey. Following a successful launch, identical versions of the roller coaster were installed at Universal Studios Japan and Universal Studios Hollywood over the next several years, with the Beijing version opening with the park in 2021.

== History ==
=== Universal Islands of Adventure ===
Flying Unicorn was one of the first rides to be added to Islands of Adventure after its grand opening, debuting on June 29, 2000, in the park's Lost Continent area. The ride took place in an enchanted forest, like something from a fairy tale. Various signs along the queue tell the story of a wizard who found a baby unicorn's horn, which it shed (once every thousand years). He then used the horn to create this ride. The magic from the unicorn's horn is used so that it can fly. Guests rode in carts designed to look like mechanical unicorns and travel over a track to the top of the lift before dropping through various dips and turns and being deposited at the start of the track.

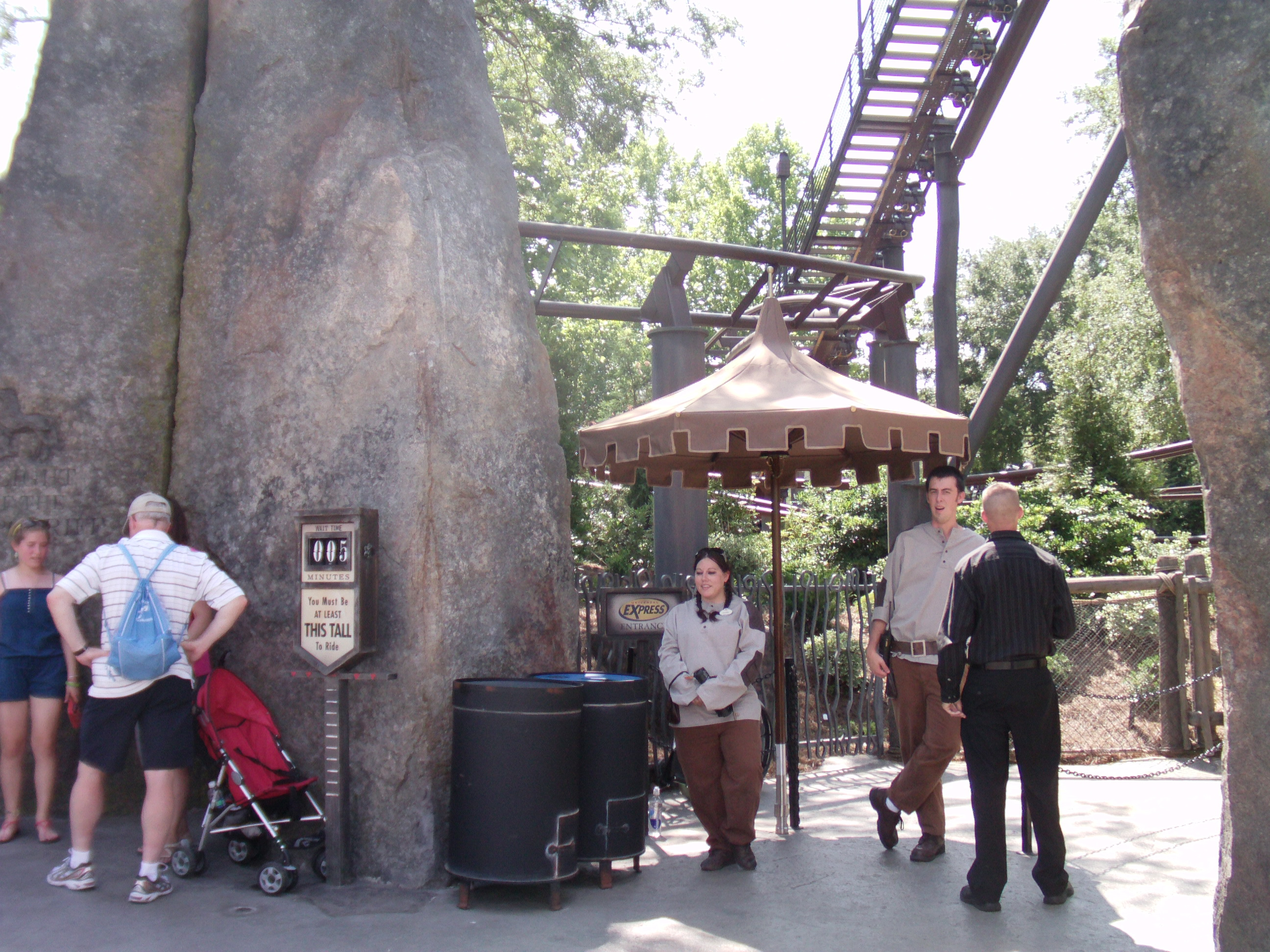
Entrance to the attraction.

Following the announcement of the Wizarding World of Harry Potter section in May 2007, both Flying Unicorn and fellow previous incarnation Dueling Dragons were shown to be in the new area, but it had not been confirmed whether they were to be closed and rethemed as of that time.

After eight years of operation, Flying Unicorn closed on July 7, 2008, to allow construction to proceed on the Wizarding World of Harry Potter.

On September 15, 2009, Universal officially revealed the attractions that would open in the Wizarding World of Harry Potter section, confirming that Flying Unicorn would be refurbished and rethemed into Flight of the Hippogriff.

The attraction soft opened on June 1, 2010, under the new name of Flight of the Hippogriff. It officially opened with the Wizarding World of Harry Potter on June 18, 2010.

=== Universal Studios Japan ===
A duplicate of the Orlando attraction was installed at Universal Studios Japan as part of the Wizarding World of Harry Potter themed area. It opened on July 15, 2014.

=== Universal Studios Hollywood ===
Flight of the Hippogriff was also installed at Universal Studios Hollywood and opened on April 7, 2016. This is the first outdoor roller coaster at the Hollywood location. It is also the first Mack Rides Youngstar Coaster in the United States.

=== Universal Studios Beijing ===
Harry Potter is a lots of Flight of the Hippogriff outdoor roller coaster at Universal Studios Beijing and opened on September 20, 2021.

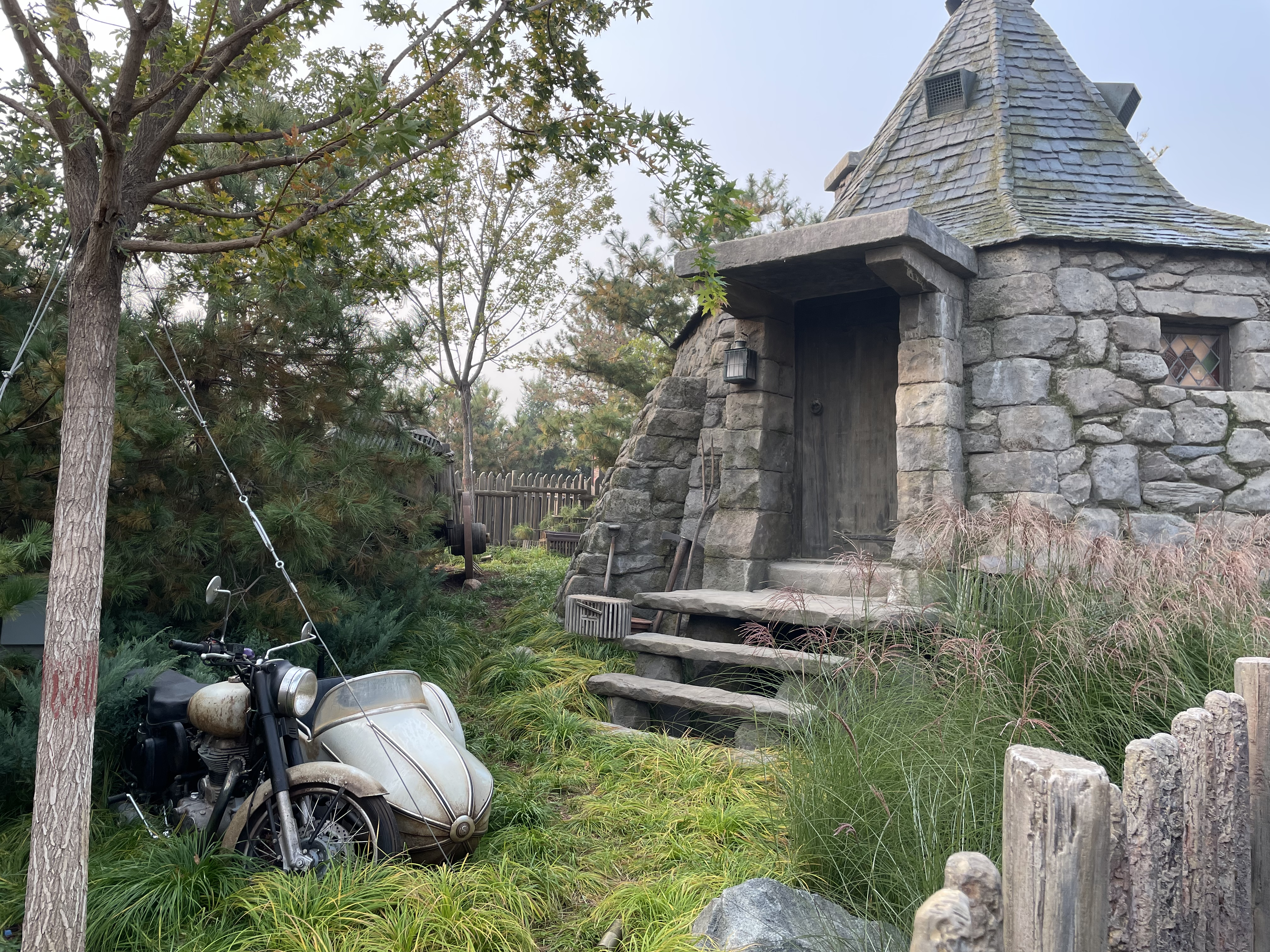
Hagrid's Hut at queue area of the attraction in Universal Studios Beijing

== Attraction summary ==
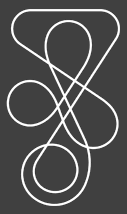
Track layout

=== Queue ===
The roller coaster's new backstory is that Hagrid is teaching young wizards how to fly a Hippogriff by using fake replicas of the creature. The queue line weaves through Hogwarts Grounds, past Hagrid's Hut and the Forest, and leads into an open canopy where Care of Magical Creatures Class is taught, and riders board the vehicle.

=== Ride ===
The roller coaster takes passengers on a test flight of the Hippogriff over the Forbidden Forest and Hagrid's Hut. Riders are instructed to bow to the Hippogriff before the ride progresses up the lift hill. The cars then travel over a track, to the top of the lift, where riders have a full aerial view of The Wizarding World, and then dropped through various dips and turns around Hogwarts Grounds before being deposited at the start of the track, where Hagrid thanks riders, who then disembark.
