= Diagon Alley =

Fictional Harry Potter shopping district

Diagon Alley is a fictional shopping district in J. K. Rowling's Harry Potter franchise. It first appeared in the 1997 novel Harry Potter and the Philosopher's Stone, and has since been featured in additional novels, film adaptations, video games, and a board game. A real-world version of the district was constructed at Universal Studios Florida in 2014.

== Places in Diagon Alley ==
On Charing Cross Road in London, the Leaky Cauldron is a shabby pub and inn that serves as the entrance to Diagon Alley. It is located between a bookstore and a record shop, and is invisible to Muggles. The rear doorway of the pub opens into a courtyard enclosed by a brick wall, and a particular brick must be tapped three times by a magic-user in order to open a passage to Diagon Alley.

Numerous locations within Diagon Alley are notable in the series:

- Eeylops Owl Emporium sells owls, which deliver wizard mail, and supplies related to their care. It is here that Rubeus Hagrid purchases the snowy owl Hedwig as a birthday gift for Harry.
- Florean Fortescue's Ice Cream Parlour sells ice cream and other treats. Mr. Fortescue, the proprietor, is highly knowledgeable about magical history; in Half-Blood Prince, he has gone missing and his parlour is boarded up.
- Flourish & Blotts sells a variety of magical books including Hogwarts textbooks.
- Gambol and Japes is a wizarding joke shop.
- Gringotts Wizarding Bank is the only wizarding bank mentioned in the novels. It is operated primarily by goblins and contains vaults that are protected by very strong and complex security measures.
- Madam Malkin's Robes for All Occasions sells robes and other clothing.
- The Magical Menagerie sells magical creatures and offers advice and supplies for their care. It is here that Hermione purchases her cat Crookshanks.
- Ollivanders is a wand shop owned by the wandmaker Mr. Ollivander. His shop closes in Half-Blood Prince after he is kidnapped by Death Eaters. He is rescued by Harry and his friends in Deathly Hallows.
- Potage's Cauldron Shop sells various types of cauldrons.
- Quality Quidditch Supplies sells broomsticks and Quidditch-related items for both fans and players.
- Slug and Jiggers Apothecary sells scales, potions and potion ingredients.
- Twilfitt and Tatting's is a clothing shop.
- Weasleys' Wizard Wheezes is a popular joke shop founded by Fred and George Weasley. It sells joke and trick items, useful novelties, sweets, and items for use in defence against the Dark Arts. They open the shop in Half-Blood Prince, after several years of product development and owl-order service. The shop is temporarily closed in Deathly Hallows, but Fred and George continue to take and fill owl orders. In the play Harry Potter and the Cursed Child, George and his younger brother Ron manage the business, Fred having been killed in the Battle of Hogwarts.
- Wiseacre's Wizarding Equipment sells various types of equipment used in the wizarding world.
- Market stalls – Diagon Alley contains a variety of stalls which sell magical objects, sweets and trinkets. After Voldemort returns, some wizards illegally peddle amulets and other objects which they claim can protect against Dementors, Inferi and werewolves.

== Appearances ==
Diagon Alley was first featured in Harry Potter and the Philosopher's Stone. It is also a location in video game adaptations such as Harry Potter: Hogwarts Mystery, Harry Potter: Magic Awakened, and Lego Harry Potter: Years 1–4. The Lego Group released a Diagon Alley themed Lego set in 2020 and another in 2025. A Diagon Alley board game was released in 2001. The former head of marketing for York's tourist body Paul Whiting stated the film producers went to York for inspiration.

== Real-world adaptations ==
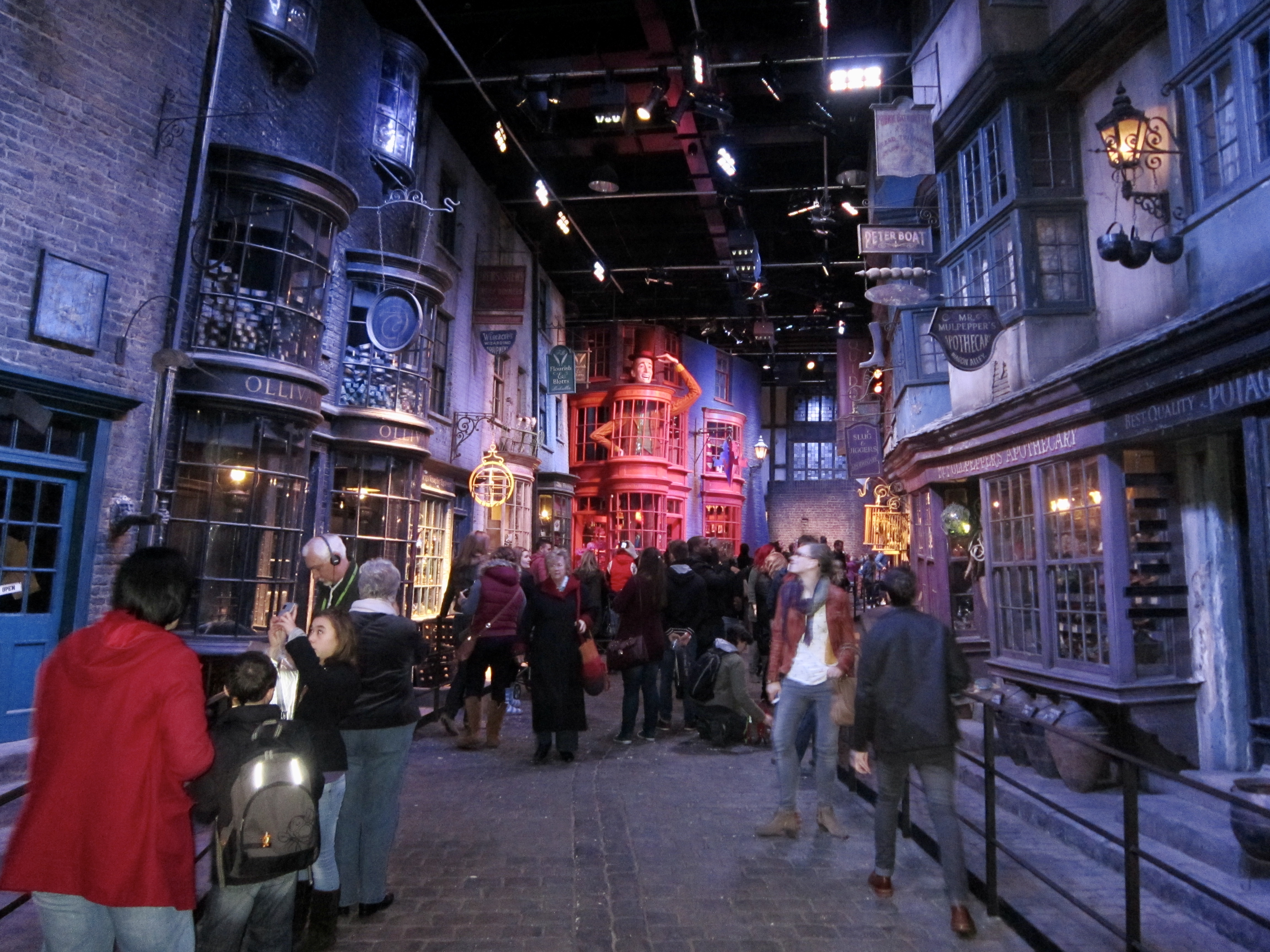
Diagon Alley in Warner Bros. Studio Tour London – The Making of Harry Potter.

Several fan adaptions of Diagon Alley have been made. Some notable examples include a pop up Diagon Alley in Sykesville, Maryland, a Diagon Alley-themed Christmas display in Austin, Texas, and a pop-up Diagon Alley in the Changi Airport.

A rebuilt version of the original Diagon Alley set is currently in the Warner Bros. Leavesden Studio Tour.

=== Universal Studios Florida ===
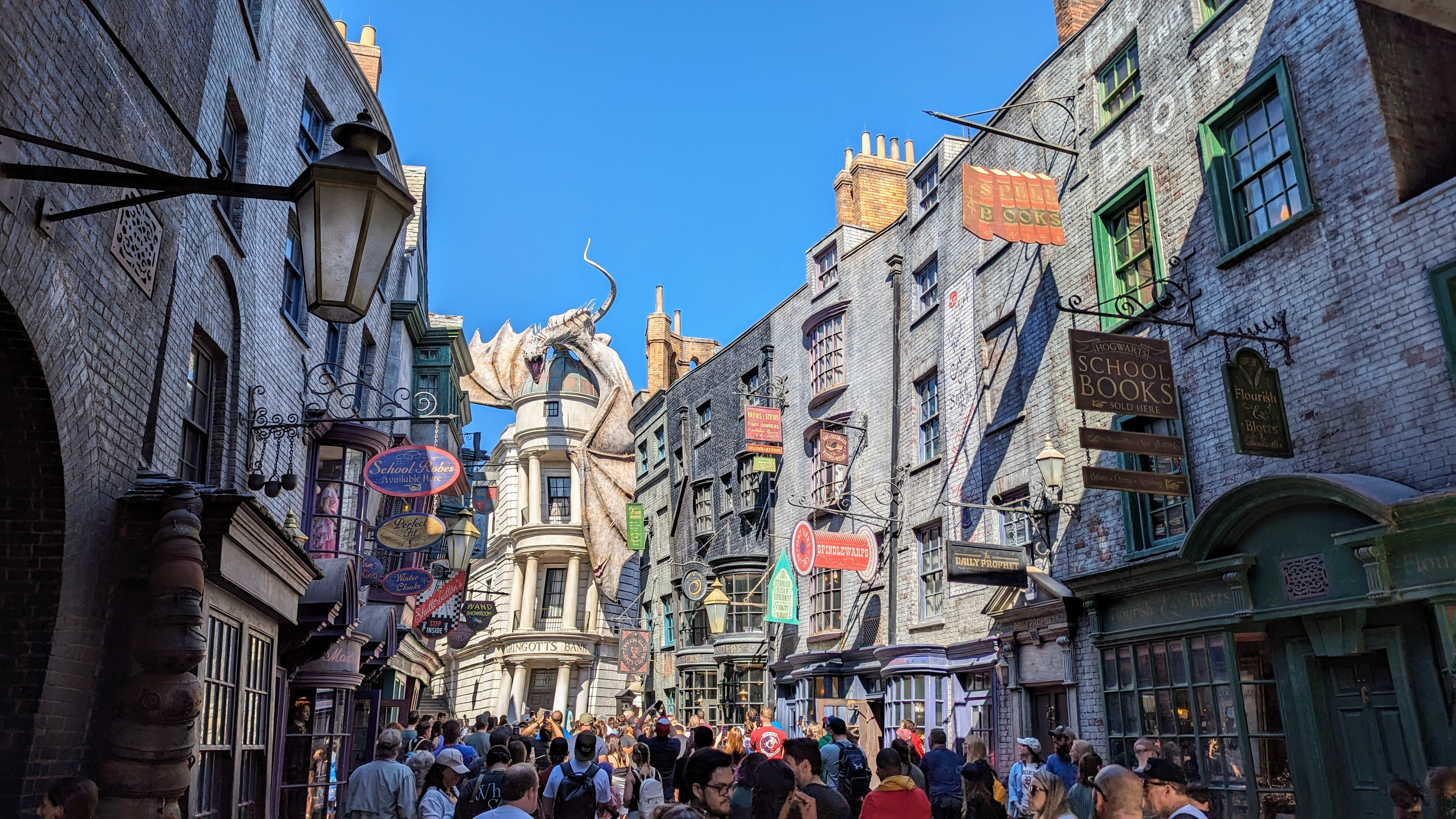
Diagon Alley in Universal Studios Florida

A real-world version of Diagon Alley was unveiled at Universal Studios Florida in 2014. The attraction was estimated to cost Universal approximately $400 million (equivalent to $535,000,000 in 2025). In the week preceding the announcement of the attraction, The Tonight Show Starring Jimmy Fallon was used to promote the Harry Potter franchise and Universal Resorts. After the release of Diagon Alley, Jimmy Fallon moved his show to Universal. Fallon brought Pitbull and Jennifer Lopez as guest stars for the episodes filmed at Universal. The creation of Diagon Alley was achieved by dismantling a Jaws attraction.

There are several restaurant and retail locations relating to the Harry Potter universe in Diagon Alley, alongside the Escape from Gringotts ride. There is also an adaptation of the Hogwarts Express that takes people between Hogsmeade (which is in Universal Islands of Adventure) and Diagon Alley.

== Reception and legacy ==
Before the release of Hogwarts Legacy, some media outlets speculated that Diagon Alley could be a visitable place in the game, but considered it unlikely. After the release of the game, several advocated for the inclusion of Diagon Alley in any potential sequel.

IGN ranked the 2025 Diagon Alley Lego set as the 11th best Harry Potter Lego set of all time. Patrick Cavanaugh, writing for ComicBook.com, criticized the size of the set but described the set as a "detailed and delightful display." Sophie Brown, writing for Wired, rated the Diagon Alley board game as a 4/5.

Scott Reintgen described the first time Harry Potter goes to Diagon Alley in the film version of Harry Potter and the Philosopher's Stone as his favorite scene in the movie. Charlie Lyne, writing for The Guardian, compared the same scene to "getting a massive nostalgia cuddle from your mind."

The dragon at the end of Diagon Alley in Universal Studios Florida has been described as noticeable. Bonnie Wright described Universal Studios Florida's Diagon Alley as "more detailed than on the set". Carly Caramanna, writing for Business Insider, praised the food and drink options at Universal Florida's Diagon Alley. Others praised the Escape from Gringotts ride.

== See also ==
- Places in Harry Potter
