= Hogwarts Express (Universal Orlando Resort) =

Railway, people mover and attraction

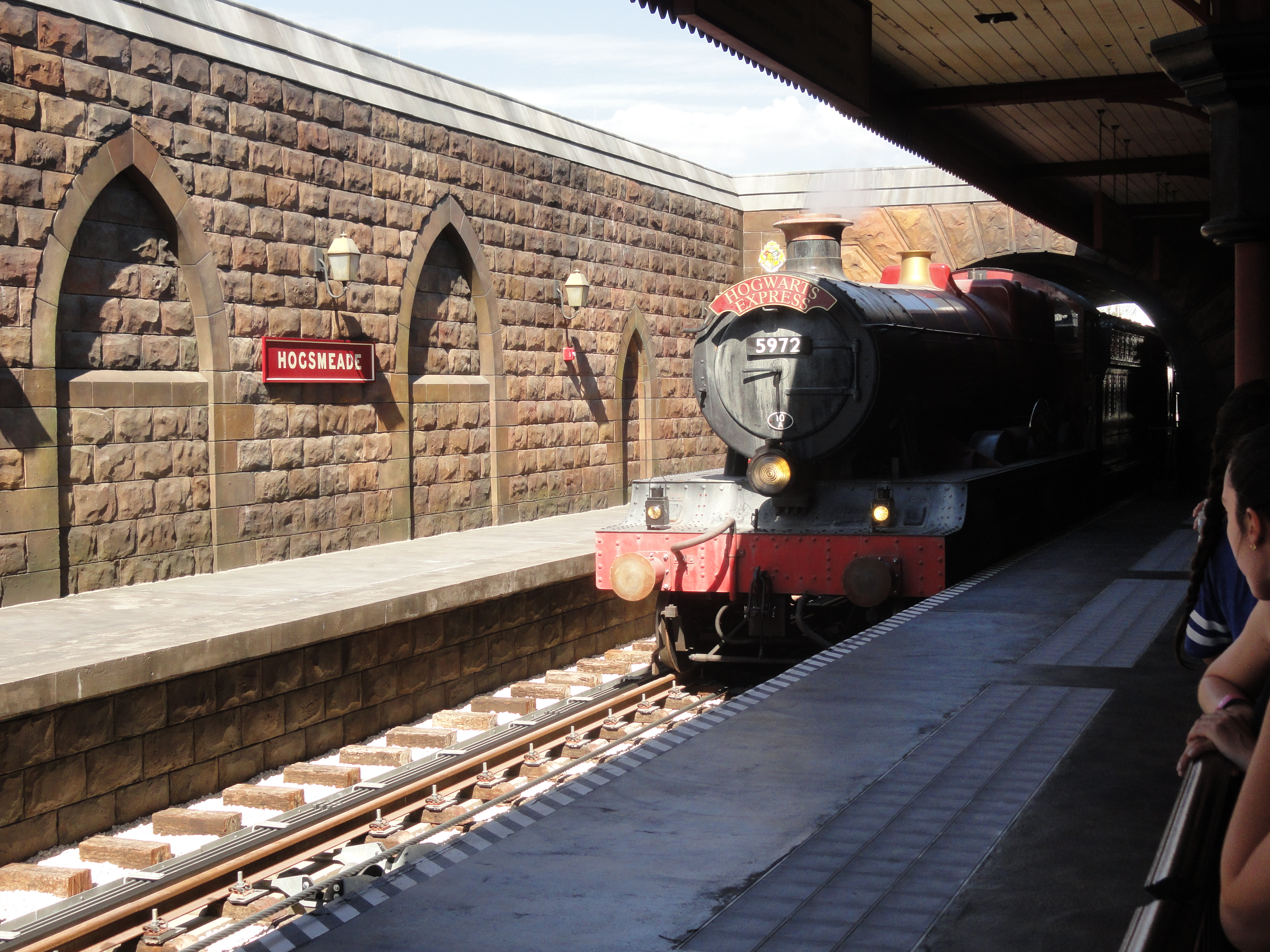
- A Hogwarts Express train arriving at Hogsmeade station in Islands of Adventure

Universal Studios Florida
- Area: The Wizarding World of Harry Potter – Diagon Alley
- Coordinates: 28.4794°N 81.4703°W
- Status: Operating
- Soft opening date: July 1, 2014
- Opening date: July 8, 2014
- Replaced: Amity Island

Universal Islands of Adventure
- Area: The Wizarding World of Harry Potter – Hogsmeade
- Coordinates: 28.4741°N 81.4727°W
- Status: Operating
- Soft opening date: July 1, 2014
- Opening date: July 8, 2014

Ride statistics
- Attraction type: Train ride
- Manufacturer: Doppelmayr/Garaventa Group
- Designer: Universal Creative; CWA Constructions
- Model: People mover
- Theme: Hogwarts Express (Harry Potter)
- Music: London Symphony Orchestra
- Length: 676 m (2,218 ft)
- Speed: 12.2 km/h (7.6 mph)
- Vehicle type: Cable car (railway)
- Vehicles: 2 replica 5972 Hogwarts Castle; 6 replica BR Mk1 CK coaches
- Riders per vehicle: 168 + 3 attendants
- Duration: 4:01
- Height restriction: Supervision required if under 48 inches (120 cm)
- No. of Tracks: Single (with passing loop)
- Track gauge: 1,800 mm (5 ft 10 7/8 in)
- Universal Express Available
- Wheelchair accessible

The Hogwarts Express is an 1,800 mm (5 ft 10 7/8 in) broad gauge cable railway, people mover, and attraction within the Universal Orlando Resort in Orlando, Florida, United States. The route runs 676 meters (2,218 ft) between Hogsmeade station in the Islands of Adventure theme park and King's Cross station in the London area of the Universal Studios Florida theme park. It provides a connection between the Diagon Alley and Hogsmeade areas in The Wizarding World of Harry Potter, based on the Harry Potter film series.

The system, which was manufactured by the Doppelmayr/Garaventa Group, is operated with two replicas of the fictional Hogwarts Express. The two directions of travel show two different videos. Because the trains transport guests between stations in two separate theme parks, riders must have an admission pass valid for both theme parks, with ticket inspectors checking prior to boarding.

The Hogwarts Express soft-opened to the public on July 1, 2014, before officially opening seven days later along with the rest of the Diagon Alley expansion. The service was immediately popular and within one month of opening, one million journeys had been made.

== History ==
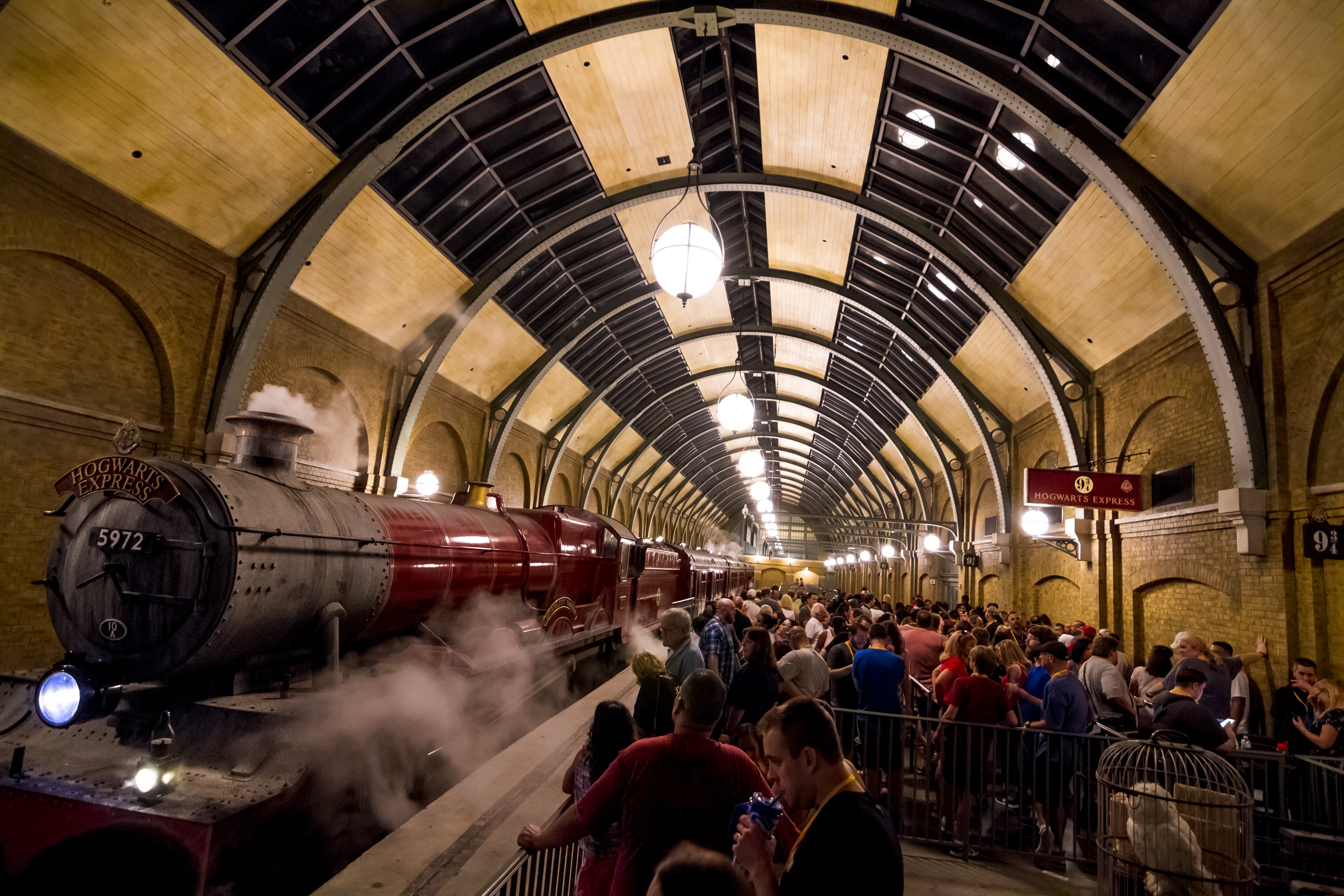
Platform 9 3/4 at King's Cross station next to Diagon Alley has a large roof based on London King's Cross railway station.

The idea of creating a Hogwarts Express-related element came from Mark Woodbury, the president of Universal Creative. After the opening of the Hogsmeade attraction at the Islands of Adventure theme park in 2010, Universal began considering how to keep attendance balanced between the adjacent parks. At first, the creative team considered putting Diagon Alley within Islands of Adventure. Eventually they decided that the London and Hogsmeade environments should not be visible from each other. As a result, Woodbury proposed building Diagon Alley in Universal Studios Florida and then connecting the two Harry Potter-themed lands. Several means of transport were proposed for the connector before planners settled on the idea of the Hogwarts Express train.

In early 2011, construction surveying was spotted in the Lost Continent section of Islands of Adventure, and the resort had begun surveying visitors about a possible expansion. This led to rumors that Universal Orlando was planning to expand The Wizarding World of Harry Potter. At the end of the year, the resort announced the Jaws: The Ride would close on January 2, 2012, to make way for Harry Potter and the Escape from Gringotts. Almost two and a half years later, WESH-TV, the local NBC affiliate for the Orlando/Central Florida area, reported that an elevated track system had been installed at Universal Orlando and that the track ran between Hogsmeade in Islands of Adventure and a construction area in Universal Studios Florida.

In May 2013, Universal Orlando announced the expansion of Wizarding World of Harry Potter, Diagon Alley, along with the Hogwarts Express train, to be located on the former site of the Jaws attraction. By the end of August 2013, all six passenger cars and both tenders were ready to be assembled on the track. The first of the two trains was installed on the track on October 24, 2013. The second train was placed on the track in early December 2013. On December 2, 2013, Orlando Attractions Magazine, an amusement park website, spotted one of the trains being tested.

The resort previewed the interior of the Hogwarts Express in January 2014 through a live cast. In mid-March 2014, Universal Orlando Resort released further information about the ride, including concept animations. The resort announced in June 2014 that the Diagon Alley expansion, including the Hogwarts Express, would officially open to the public on July 8, 2014. A week later, Universal Orlando soft-opened the Hogwarts Express, without any announcement. Within a month of the Hogwarts Express' opening, one million riders had ridden the Hogwarts Express. It had taken approximately two and a half years to develop by a team of 150 people.

== Characteristics ==
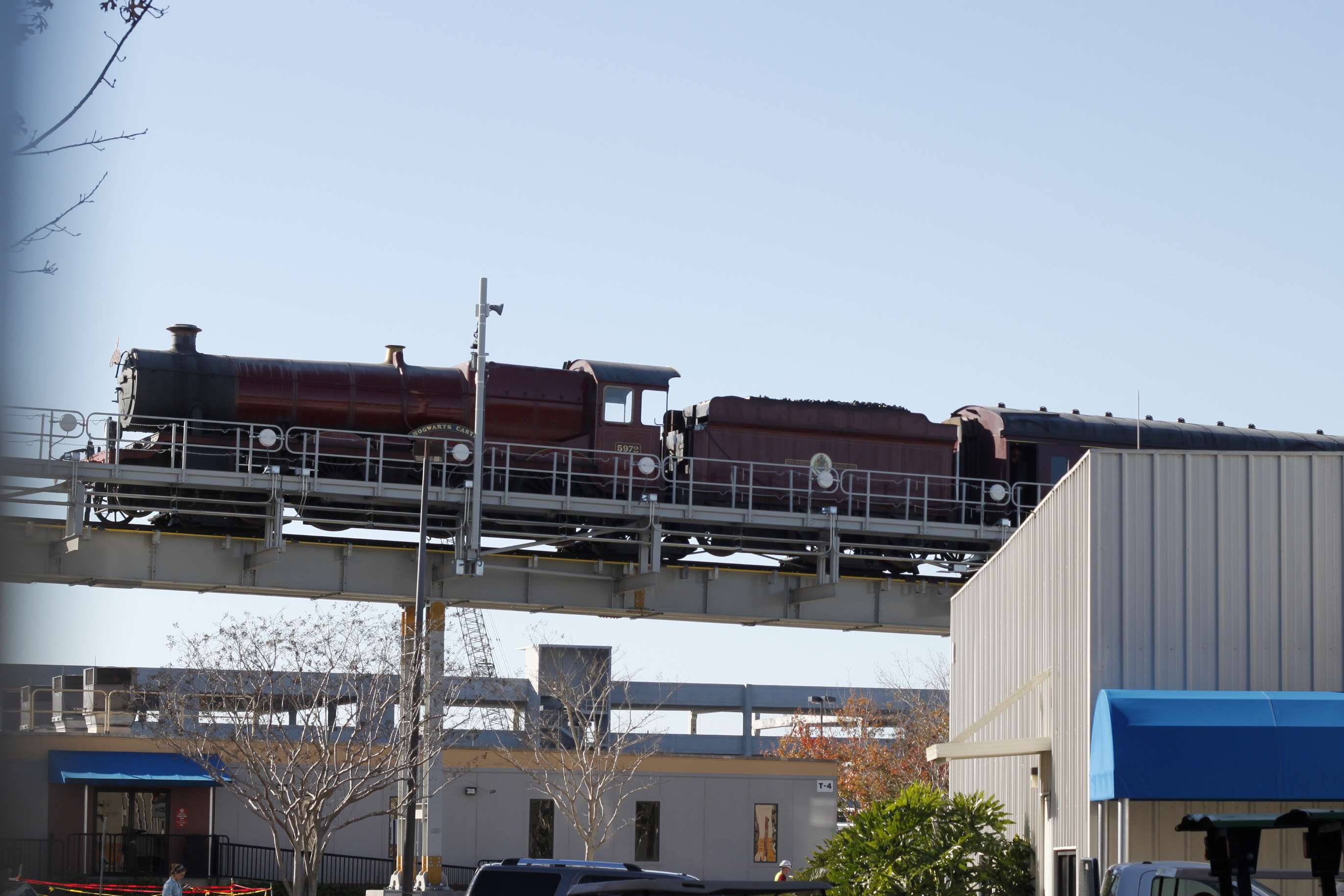
Trains pass over the Universal Orlando backlot between stations.

It is only possible to ride the Hogwarts Express after having already entered either theme park and presenting a ticket that allows admission to both of them on the same day. The train carries 30,000 passengers per day, and operates 365 days per year.

=== Track ===
Hogwarts Express is a single-track elevated cable railway running over the backlot between the two theme parks, with a two-track passing loop at the midpoint. It is 676 meters (2,218 ft) long and has a track gauge of 1,800 mm (5 ft 10 7/8 in). On the track, there is a haul rope and a counter rope, each with a diameter of 46 millimeters (1.8 in). The cable winding motor is at King's Cross station and has a rated load of 215 kilowatts (300 hp) and a peak power rating of 636 kilowatts (900 hp).

=== Trains ===
The Hogwarts Express uses two trains that can transport 168 passengers each, giving a total of 336 passengers per cycle. Each train is an articulated cable car formed of five sections: a replica of a steam locomotive and its tender plus a set of three passenger coaches each with seven passenger compartments. Each compartment holds up to eight seated passengers and has its own projection system instead of windows. Originally each train was planned to have two passenger coaches; the number was increased following a survey that suggested potential passengers saw the Hogwarts Express as an attraction rather than a means of transportation between the parks. The locomotive on the 70-meter-long (230 ft) trains weigh 13 metric tons (29,000 lb), the tenders weigh 15 metric tons (33,000 lb), and each passenger carriage weighs 27 metric tons (60,000 lb). Because movement of the trains is controlled by cable from an engine house, they depart and arrive at the end stations at the same time, and always reach the halfway point at the same time. The cable moves at the speed of 3.4 meters per second (12 km/h; 7.6 mph).

On both trains, the locomotive faces towards Hogsmeade station; it is not possible for the trains to face King's Cross. As a result, the Hogwarts Express departs from Hogsmeade and enters King's Cross in reverse. At each station, the platforms are located on the left side of the trains. The trains are therefore only designed to be seen from one side; the other lacks the locomotives' false driving wheels and specific detailing. Over 70 percent of the cabling in the trains are for the show effects and physically animated components.

The trains were built in Goldau, Switzerland. CWA Constructions designed both the exterior and interior of the trains to make them look as similar as possible to the Hogwarts Express seen in the Harry Potter film franchise. They are based on the steam locomotive GWR Hall class 5972 Olton Hall (as 5972 Hogwarts Castle) and were built from aluminum and glass-reinforced plastics. Afterwards, an artificial weathering process was applied to give the appearance of a historic train.

Frey AG was responsible for wiring the trains for the video and sound components. The company also installed other technical equipment that allows the trains to be controlled by a computer system.

==== Media ====
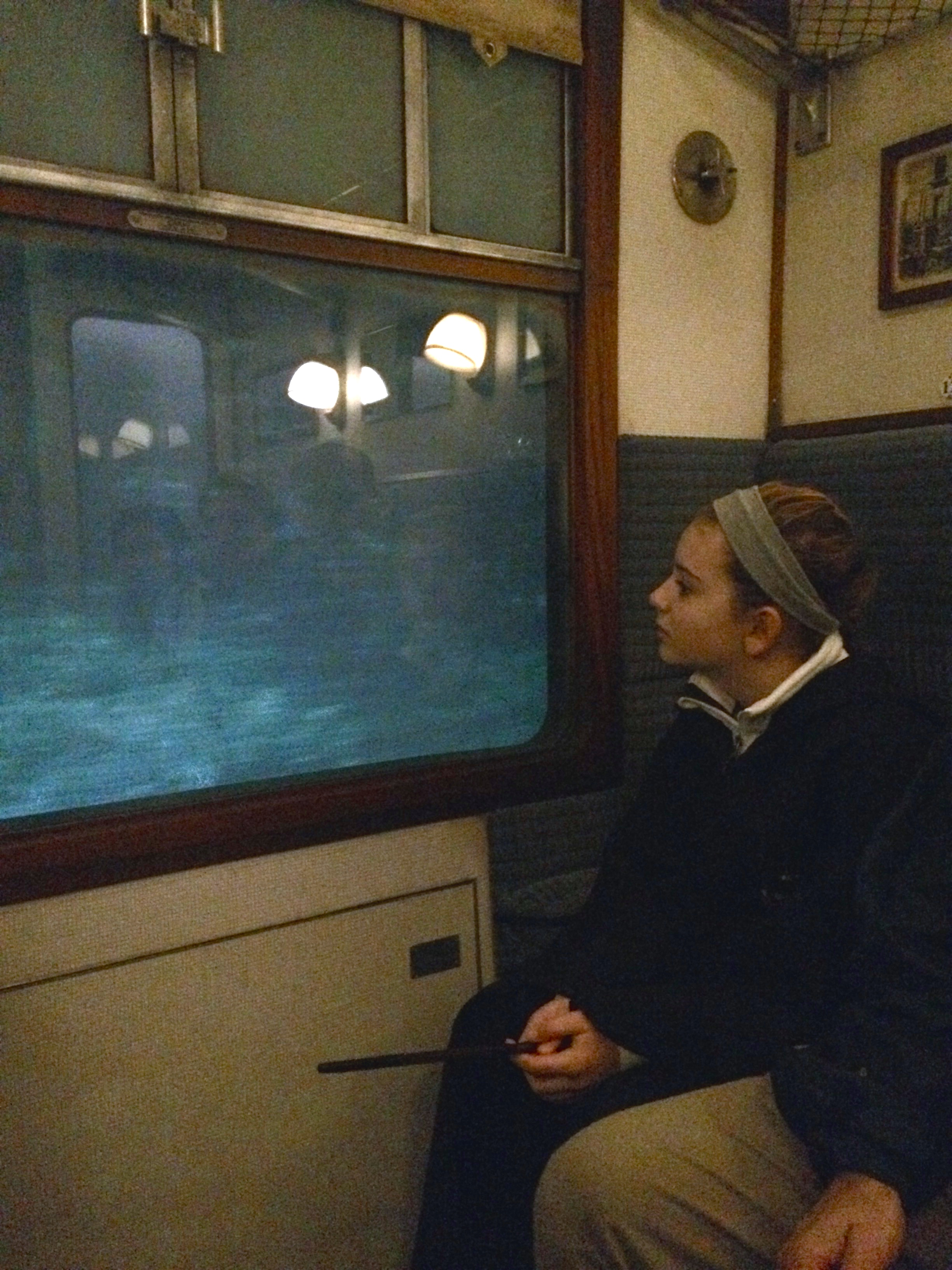
Curved projection system behind each compartment window

Each compartment has a curved screen where the window would be. There are two different videos, depending on the destination of the train. The special effects in both videos were by Double Negative.

In addition, shadows of characters appear on the compartment windows, which exchange dialogue. Due to Emma Watson not reprising her role as Hermione for the attraction, a voice double was hired in her place. This voice double was criticized for sounding too dissimilar to Watson; in late 2023, Universal updated Hermione's voice.

The London Symphony Orchestra recorded the music played throughout the journey at Abbey Road Studios on March 25, 2014. The music for the northbound journey is called "Connector Train – Hogsmeade to London", while the southbound journey is called "Connector Train – London to Hogsmeade".

== Journey ==
Theme park guests may use the Hogwarts Express to travel between Hogsmeade and King's Cross in London, close to Diagon Alley. They can travel in either direction as long as the guest has purchased a Park-to-Park ticket, Annual Pass, or Seasonal Pass, which gives guests access to both of Universal Orlando's theme parks within the same day. Two different videos are provided depending on the destination of the train, both of which are approximately four minutes long.

=== King's Cross to Hogsmeade ===
The King's Cross station is built on a site that previously held the Jaws attraction. The entrance to the station, which is a quarter-scale replica of London King's Cross railway station, is located in the London area, close to Diagon Alley. Passengers enter the station building and have their admission ticket checked. They then enter a queue which takes them farther into the station building, under a split-flap departure board, and past London-related advertisements, several stacks of suitcases and a shop selling British brands of food and drink. After ascending a flight of stairs, passengers find themselves between signs for King's Cross Platform 9 and Platform 10. They can see those ahead of them walking through the "wall" forming the entrance to Platform 9 3/4. This effect uses the Pepper's ghost illusion. After continuing around several corners, guests arrive on Platform 9 3/4 to wait for the next train. After the Hogwarts Express has reversed into Platform 9 3/4 and the arriving passengers have disembarked, the next passengers enter one of the twenty-one compartments in the three passenger coaches.

As the train departs King's Cross, the video sequence in the compartments starts with Hedwig the owl flying alongside while passing through the outskirts of London. Hedwig flies away and Dementors arrive from over the nearby buildings. At the same time Harry Potter, Ron Weasley, and Hermione Granger pass along the corridor side of the coach looking for food. The journey enters a tunnel; upon its exit, it passes by Malfoy Manor during a stormy night. Next, the train passes through a second tunnel and the lights in the compartments go out as a Dementor enters the train and passes along the corridor; Harry Potter uses his magic to defeat the Dementor. After exiting the tunnel, riders are greeted by Rubeus Hagrid flying on a motorbike with Hogwarts in the background. As the train enters a forest, the flying Ford Anglia appears and starts driving through the terrain. The car crashes soon after and the train leaves the forest, passing by Hogwarts once again before arriving at Hogsmeade Station with Hagrid greeting passengers.

Passengers then disembark from the train, walk down a ramp past the front of the Hogwarts Express and follow a path leading to Hogsmeade.

=== Hogsmeade to King's Cross ===
At the entrance of the queue, ticket inspectors check passengers' tickets for Universal Studios. The line then leads into a forested area which leads into the Hogsmeade station building. Upon climbing a flight of steps, travelers reach the Hogsmeade station platform. Once the arriving passengers on the Hogwarts Express have left the platform, passengers waiting may then board the train and enter one of the twenty-one passenger compartments within the train.

As the train departs towards King's Cross, the video sequence in the compartments begins with Hagrid waving goodbye outside of the window. Shadows of Harry Potter, Ron Weasley, and Hermione Granger can also been seen walking down the train corridor, looking for an empty compartment. Following this, Buckbeak flies outside the window, while Hogwarts can be seen in the background. Shortly after, the train enters a forest where centaurs are running. Upon exiting the forest, Hogwarts can be seen once again in the background. Fred and George Weasley appear, flying broomsticks and playing with fireworks. The Hogwarts Express then enters a tunnel, after which riders find themselves in the middle of a storm and pass Malfoy Manor. A flash of lightning strikes a tree, providing a glimpse of Lord Voldemort. The journey then enters a second tunnel; Harry, Ron, and Hermione appear again in the train corridor. As a licorice spider crawls up the compartment door, Harry eats it (to Ron's horror) and the trio continue to walk on down the corridor. After the tunnel the journey continues into London passing by an industrial factory and then a residential area. The Knight Bus then appears; squeezing between buildings and shrinking to pass under a bridge. As the bus drives away, the train enters King's Cross station, where Alastor Moody greets passengers.

Passengers then disembark onto Platform 9 3/4 of King's Cross and proceed down some stairs into a 2010-era King's Cross station, before arriving at the London waterfront area, adjacent to Diagon Alley.

Hogwarts Express stations

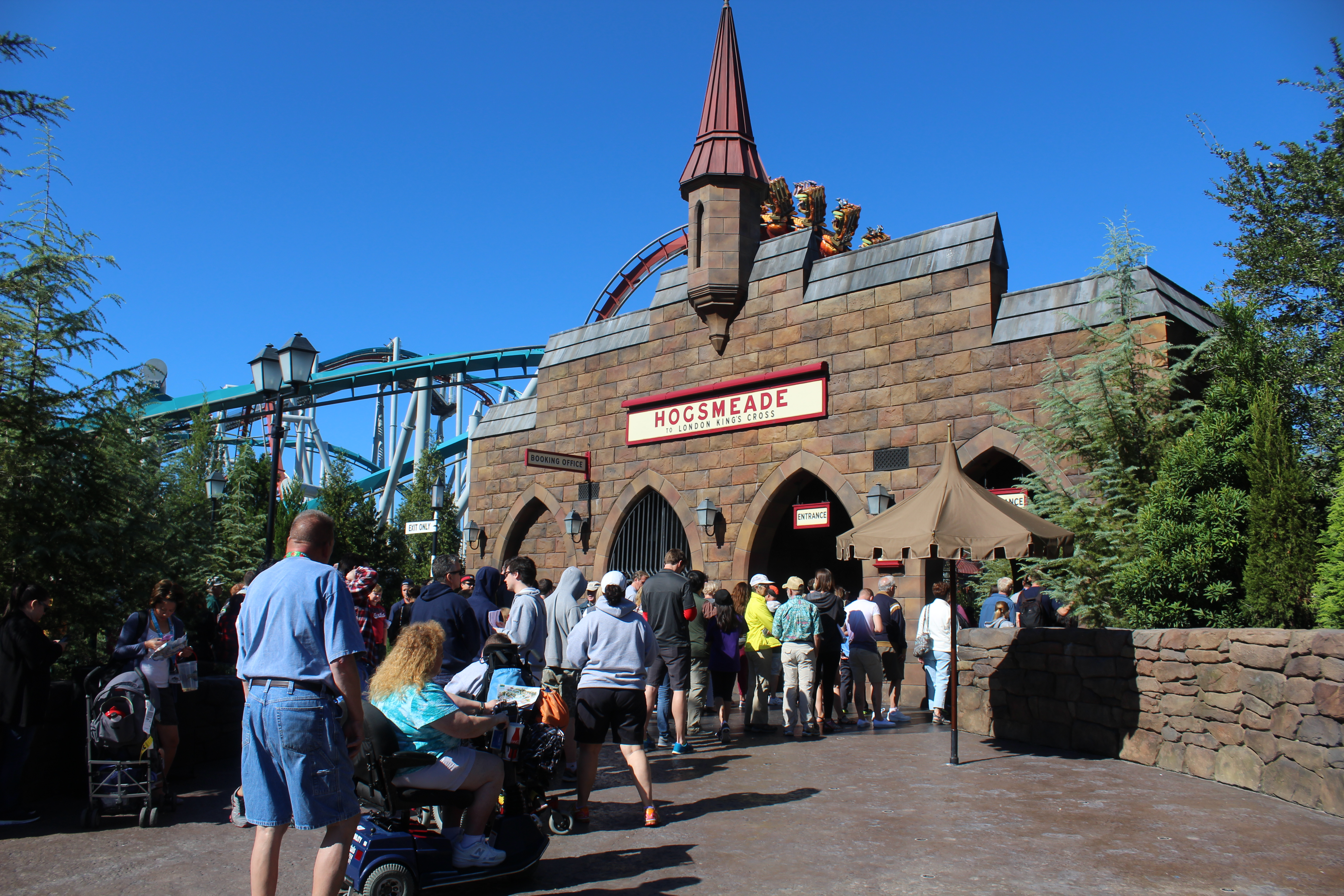
Hogsmeade Station

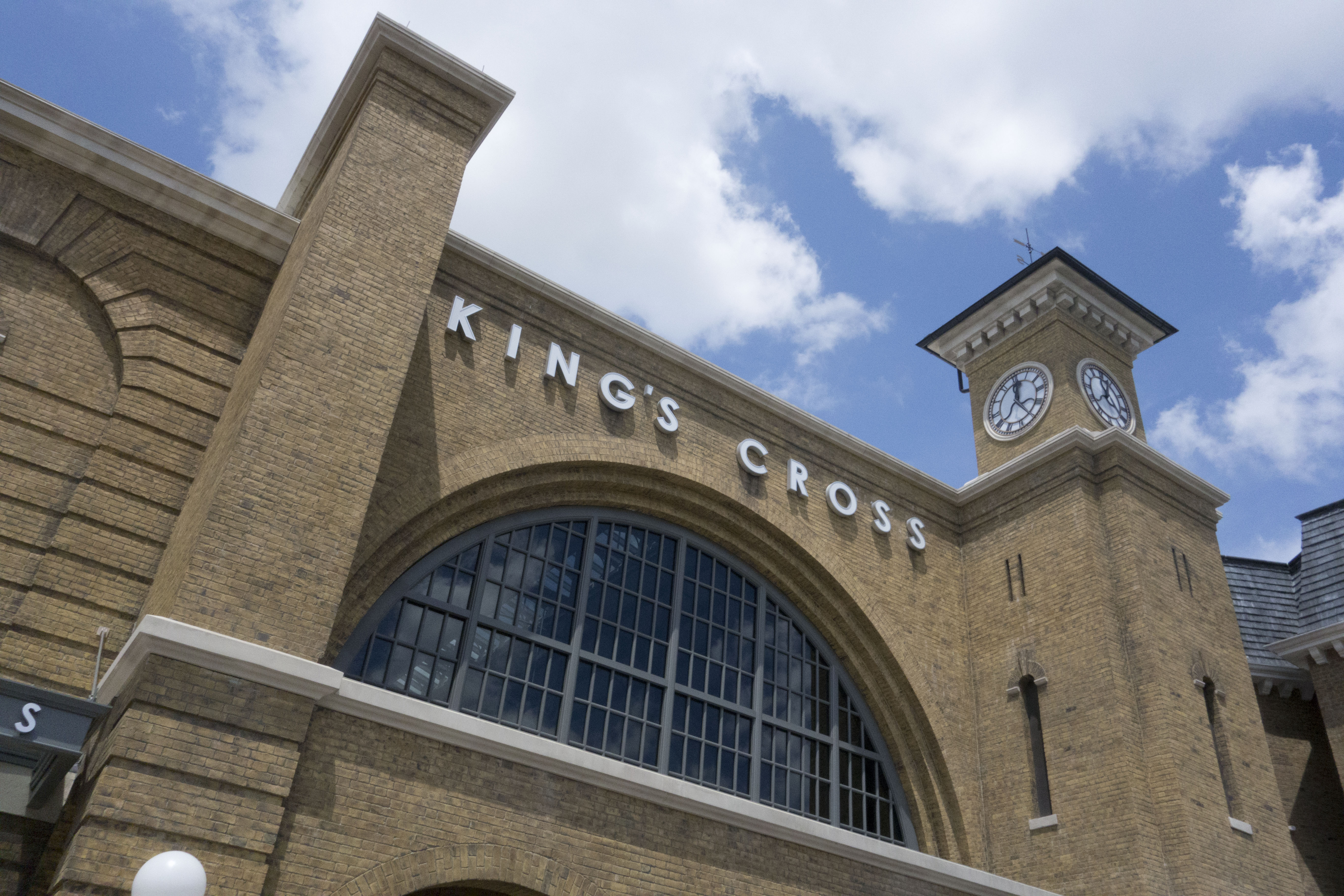
King's Cross Station

== Reception ==
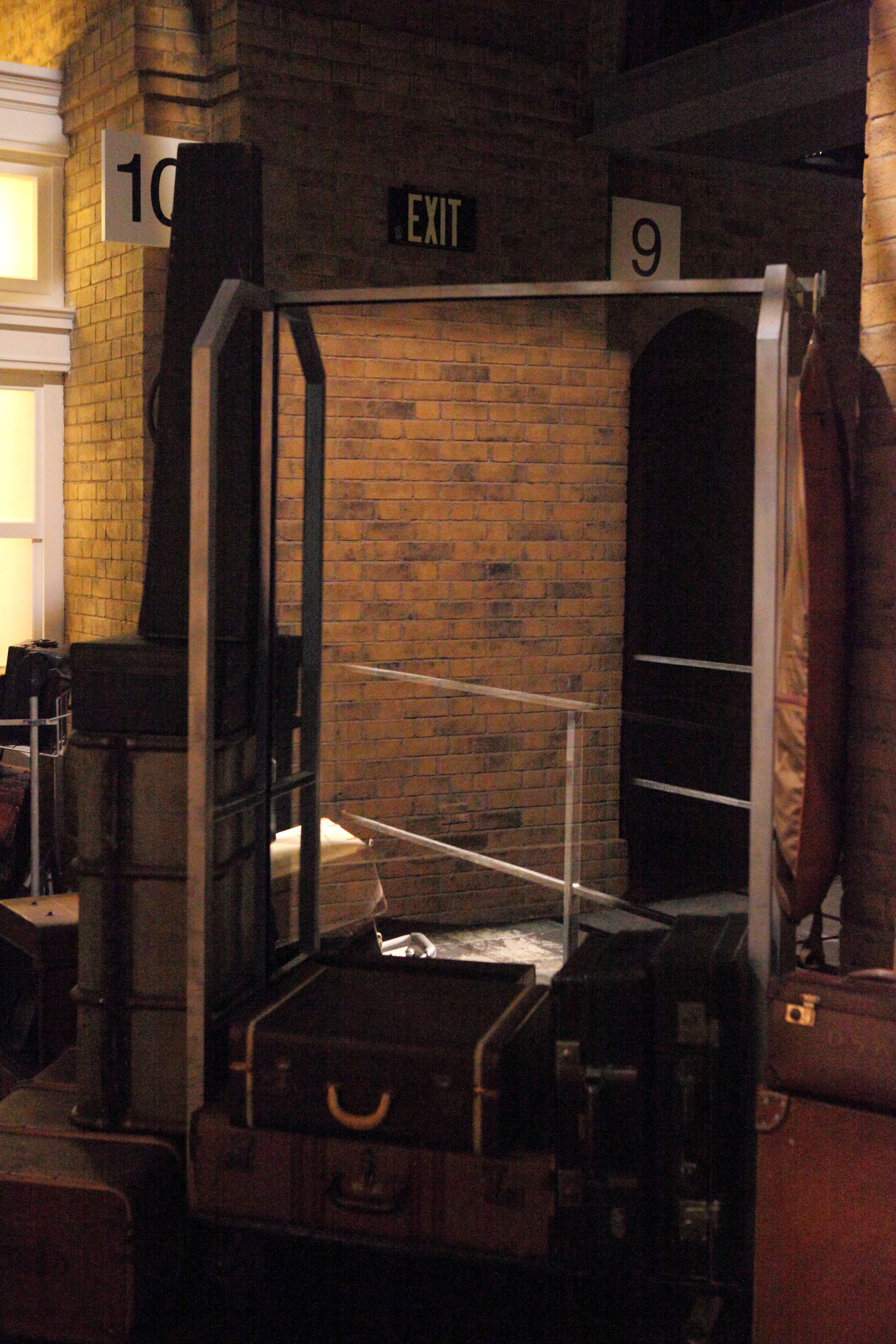
Using a Pepper's ghost illusion, those ahead in the queue appear to pass through a brick wall.

Robert Niles from Theme Park Insider mentioned how the attraction "broke walls". Examples included the separation of the Wizarding and Muggle worlds; how Universal made the audience the performers (in the part of the King's Cross queue where guests walk through the wall leading to Platform 9 3/4). He wrote: "It's become convention for theme park attractions to drop you off at or very near the same point where you boarded the ride, so it's a bit disorienting when you exit the Hogwarts Express and find that you're not only in a different train station — you're in a different theme park."

Arthur Levine from About.com was disappointed that Universal had not tried to re-create the magical aspect of guests entering Platform 9 3/4: "When it's time to make their own way to the platform, however, it appears to would-be wizards that they are merely entering a darkened corridor. Aside from an audible "whoosh" sound, there is, regrettably, no attempt to reproduce the magical, molecule-shifting phenomenon". He also found it awkward that the Hogwarts Express reverses into Platform 9 3/4 at King's Cross—although in Hogsmeade the train arrives facing forwards. Overall Levine said that the attraction does more than just making it a ride: "By making it an integral and compelling part of The Wizarding World, most guests would want to ride it to get the complete Potter experience. By making it an inter-park ride and requiring a two-park ticket to board it, Universal will surely help up-sell a lot more customers to higher-priced passes, encourage multi-day visits, increase demand for its on-property hotels, and drive business at its CityWalk dining/shopping/entertainment district".

In 2014, attendance at Universal Studios Florida increased to 8.3 million visitors, compared to 7.1 million in the previous year. Attendance at Islands of Adventure did not change. According to vice president of AECOM's economics, Brian Sands, the attendance increase at the Studios was likely due to the Diagon Alley expansion. Sands also mentioned attendance at Islands of Adventure remained the same since "visitors go to the new thing", though the Hogwarts Express likely prevented attendance from decreasing at the park.

== Incidents ==
- On October 1, 2016, a man and a 14-year-old girl were treated for burn injuries after an e-cigarette exploded on the ride.
- On August 17, 2017, both Hogwarts Express trains were evacuated outside of each station. Some passengers were stranded inside the vehicles for over an hour without air conditioning. The incident happened again a week later, on August 24, 2017. Universal blamed "technical issues" for both incidents.

== See also ==
- 2014 in amusement parks
- The Jacobite (steam train)
- Walt Disney World Railroad
- Warner Bros. Studio Tour London - The Making of Harry Potter
