= The Wizarding World of Harry Potter (Universal Orlando Resort) =

Area in Universal Orlando theme parks

Coordinates: 28.4728°N 81.4734°W

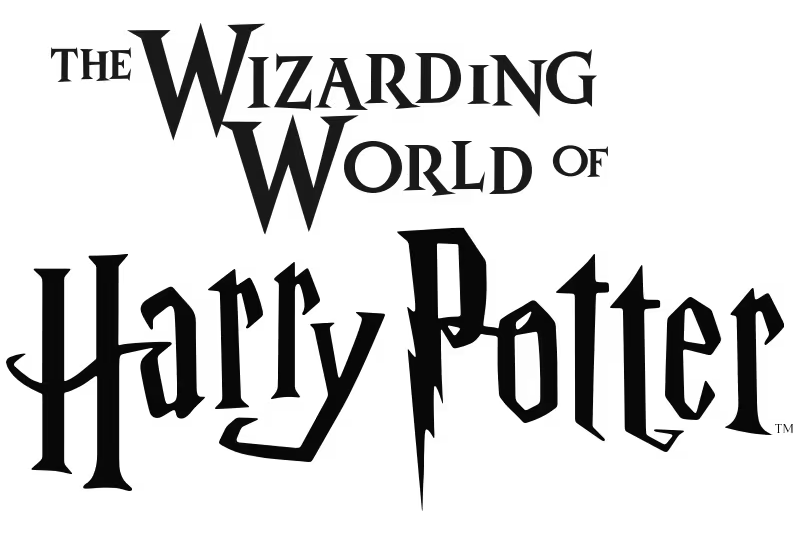

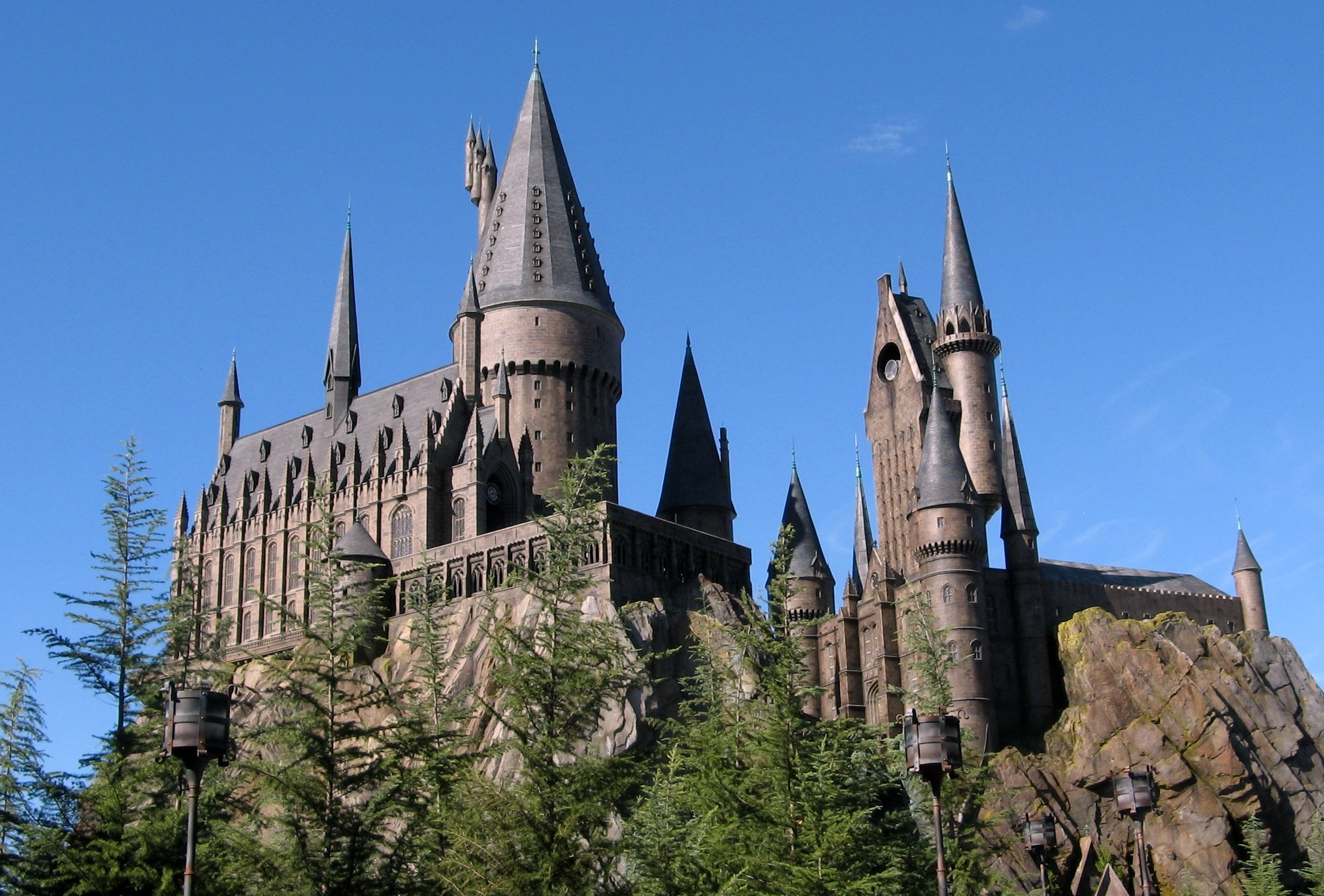
- Hogwarts Castle, which houses Harry Potter and the Forbidden Journey at Islands of Adventure
- Interactive map of The Wizarding World of Harry Potter
- Theme: Harry Potter (book series, film series and universe)

Universal Islands of Adventure
- Status: Operating
- Opened: June 18, 2010
- Replaced: Merlinwood (The Lost Continent)

Universal Studios Florida
- Status: Operating
- Opened: July 8, 2014
- Replaced: Amity Island

Universal Epic Universe
- Status: Operating
- Opened: May 22, 2025

The Wizarding World of Harry Potter at the Universal Orlando Resort in Orlando, Florida is a collection of themed areas spanning three theme parks—Universal Islands of Adventure, Universal Studios Florida and Universal Epic Universe. The area is themed to the Wizarding World media franchise, adapting elements from the Harry Potter and Fantastic Beasts film series and novels by J. K. Rowling, in partnership with Warner Bros. under an exclusive license agreement. The Wizarding World of Harry Potter was well received and significantly boosted attendance at the resort.

The first Harry Potter themed area was officially announced for Islands of Adventure on May 31, 2007, and after a two-and-a-half-year construction period, The Wizarding World of Harry Potter – Hogsmeade opened to the public on June 18, 2010. The area's flagship ride is Harry Potter and the Forbidden Journey, a dark ride that takes riders on a journey in and around Hogwarts School of Witchcraft and Wizardry.

The second area to open was The Wizarding World of Harry Potter – Diagon Alley at the adjacent Universal Studios Florida theme park. The expanded area opened on July 8, 2014, themed to the London-based area from the book and film series. Harry Potter and the Escape from Gringotts, an indoor steel coaster that utilizes motion-based 3D effects, is the main attraction of the expansion along with the Hogwarts Express train ride, which transports guests between the two lands. A third themed area, The Wizarding World of Harry Potter – Ministry of Magic themed to 1920s Paris from the Fantastic Beasts film series and opened in 2025 at Universal Epic Universe. The flagship ride, Harry Potter and the Battle at the Ministry, brings riders to the 1990s British Ministry of Magic via the Floo network and a time turner, where they become involved in the trial of Dolores Umbridge.

== History ==
=== Previous attempts ===
Rumors of a Harry Potter–themed area at a Universal Studios park or a Disney park started to circulate in 2003. However, the rights to the Harry Potter franchise had been acquired by Warner Bros., who denied all the rumors. In 2001, Time Warner used this license to construct and operate the Harry Potter Movie Magic Experience at Warner Bros. Movie World on the Gold Coast, Australia; it was a small indoor walkthrough featuring many re-creations of locations in the first two movies. After two years of operation, it was removed.

The Walt Disney Company and Universal entered bidding negotiations with Warner Bros. and Rowling for the theme park rights to Harry Potter in the United States. In 2004, Rowling signed a letter-of-intent with Disney, with the company intending to develop a Harry Potter section in a corner of Fantasyland, within the Magic Kingdom park at Walt Disney World. Ultimately, Disney pulled out of negotiations, citing that Rowling's creative influence and the terms established by Warner Bros. were too stringent.

=== Rumors and official announcement ===
In January 2007, About.com reported a rumor from a "highly credible source" that the Lost Continent area within Islands of Adventure park was to be re-themed "to the stories and characters of one of the most popular children's franchises". Other sources followed up in the next few days with unofficial confirmation the new area would involve Harry Potter, and was being developed under the name "Project Strong Arm" in reference to the KUKA robotic arm technology it would utilise. Nikki Finke reported her own confirmation of the Potter park plans in April, followed shortly by a story in The Scotsman; both reports were widely relayed by other media sources. On May 31, 2007, Universal (in partnership with Warner Bros.) officially announced the 20-acre (8.1 ha) addition recreating Hogwarts, the Forbidden Forest and Hogsmeade, with a planned opening in 2009.

=== 2010: Islands of Adventure ===
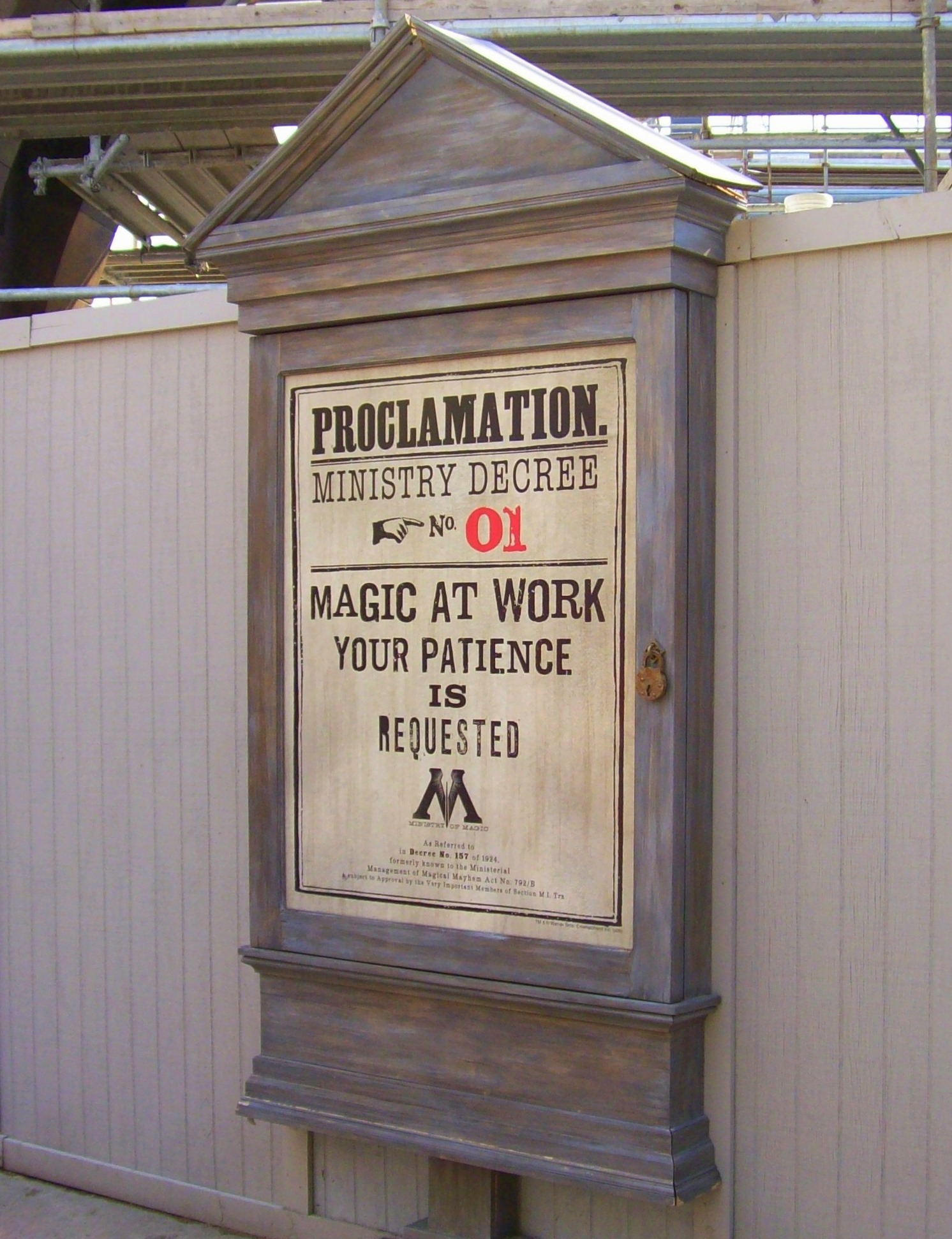
Themed billboards were located around the Wizarding World during the two-year construction period.

Construction of the Wizarding World of Harry Potter began seven months after the official announcement, in January 2008. By July, the Flying Unicorn and Enchanted Oak Tavern were closed. The Flying Unicorn then began an almost two-year refurbishment, which transformed it into the Flight of the Hippogriff. The Enchanted Oak Tavern was later demolished. A bridge was built to connect The Lost Continent with Jurassic Park, allowing guests to avoid the construction zone that was to become the Wizarding World. By September 2008, the Dueling Dragons entrance was moved to Jurassic Park to make room for the construction of Hogsmeade. One month later, the old entrance was demolished. By September 2009, the top shell of Hogwarts Castle was completed. On September 15, an announcement was made detailing what would be included in the Wizarding World. In early 2010, Universal increased its marketing efforts in the area, which included newspaper advertisements, billboards, and television commercials. The Dueling Dragons were closed for some maintenance before being transformed into the Dragon Challenge. Construction was completed by June 1, 2010, when the area began soft openings. The land opened with three rides: the Harry Potter and the Forbidden Journey, a dark ride inside Hogwarts Castle, and the rethemed Flight of the Hippogriff and Dueling Dragons.

A soft opening weekend was held for the media and reserved guests, starting on May 28, 2010. The park held two opening ceremonies, which took place on June 16 and June 18, 2010. The Wizarding World of Harry Potter's grand opening ceremony took place on June 16 with book series author J. K. Rowling and film series actors Daniel Radcliffe, Rupert Grint, Emma Watson, Michael Gambon, Robbie Coltrane, Tom Felton, Matthew Lewis, James and Oliver Phelps, and Bonnie Wright, as well as Universal Orlando Resort officials and representatives from the media. The ceremony, which was produced by Universal Orlando Events Production in conjunction with Thinkwell Group, concluded with a fireworks display and a performance by the Orlando Philharmonic Orchestra, conducted by original series' composer John Williams. On June 18, the second ceremony took place, which officially opened the Wizarding World of Harry Potter to the public. NBC's Today Show and The Weather Channel broadcast segments live from the park.

=== 2014: Universal Studios Florida ===
The opening of the Wizarding World of Harry Potter led to a 36% increase in attendance at Islands of Adventure in 2010. According to Jason Garcia of the Orlando Sentinel, this had resort executives pondering "when to expand Wizarding World and how to keep business balanced between Islands and Universal Studios Florida". In April 2011, Brady MacDonald of the Los Angeles Times mentioned that rapid attendance growth led to speculation that the Wizarding World of Harry Potter would see a significant expansion, which would include Diagon Alley and a Gringotts-themed dark ride possibly replacing the Lost Continent themed area in Islands of Adventure.

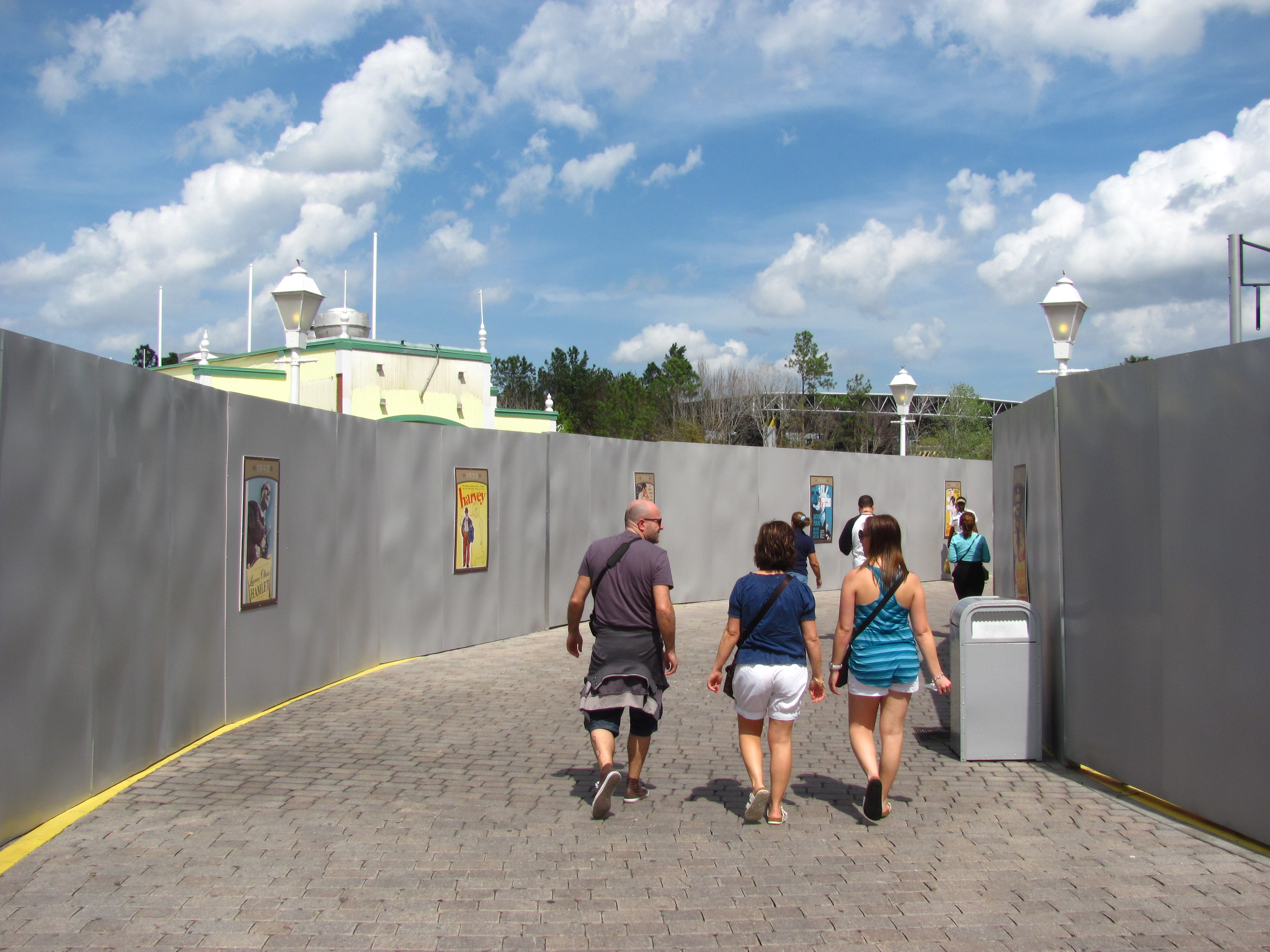
Demolition of the Jaws ride and the surrounding Amity in March 2012

On December 6, 2011, Universal Parks & Resorts confirmed expansion plans but did not reveal specific details. The announcement was made just four days after Universal revealed plans to permanently close the Jaws attraction. Following its closure the following month, the Los Angeles Times stated that the site of the former Jaws ride in Universal Studios Florida would be used for the Wizarding World of Harry Potter expansion, despite what previous speculation suggested. These rides would be complemented by a replica of the Hogwarts Express to move guests between the two parks. Demolition of the Jaws ride and the Amity area began almost immediately after their closure. After the site was leveled, work began on land reclamation in the area's former lagoon, as well as construction of a series of buildings including a large show building.

Further details about the expansion of the Wizarding World of Harry Potter were announced on May 8, 2013. Officials confirmed that the expansion would be primarily located in the adjacent Universal Studios Florida theme park and would feature areas themed after Diagon Alley and London. The rumored connection between the two parks via the Hogwarts Express was also confirmed. Officials stated that the expansion is expected to open in 2014.

On January 23, 2014, officials announced the name of the flagship roller coaster would be Harry Potter and the Escape from Gringotts. They also indicated that a two-park pass would be necessary to ride the Hogwarts Express, which was set to connect Universal Studios Florida with the existing Harry Potter area at Islands of Adventure.

The official opening date of Diagon Alley was announced at an exclusive and private press conference on June 17, 2014, for July 8, 2014. On June 18, 2014, the Diagon Alley red carpet premiere took place with Domhnall Gleeson, Bonnie Wright, Evanna Lynch, Matthew Lewis, James and Oliver Phelps, Tom Felton, Robbie Coltrane, Warwick Davis and Helena Bonham Carter attending. New photos of Diagon Alley were later released the same night and the official opening date was announced publicly by Universal Orlando's president, Bill Davis. King's Cross station opened on July 1, 2014, as well as the Hogwarts Express Hogsmeade Station at Universal Islands of Adventure and soft openings of Diagon Alley began on July 3, 2014. Diagon Alley officially opened on July 8, 2014.

=== 2025: Universal Epic Universe ===
A third themed area titled The Wizarding World of Harry Potter – Ministry of Magic opened in 2025 at the Universal Epic Universe theme park. The area blends the 1920s wizarding Paris from the Fantastic Beasts film series with the British Ministry of Magic. The 1920s wizarding Paris area includes the theatrical show Le Cirque Arcanus and also features a location where guests can time travel by Métro-Floo to the 1990s British Ministry of Magic area featuring the ride Harry Potter and the Battle at the Ministry, which revolves around the trial of Dolores Umbridge.

== Themed Areas and Attractions ==
=== Hogsmeade at Islands of Adventure ===
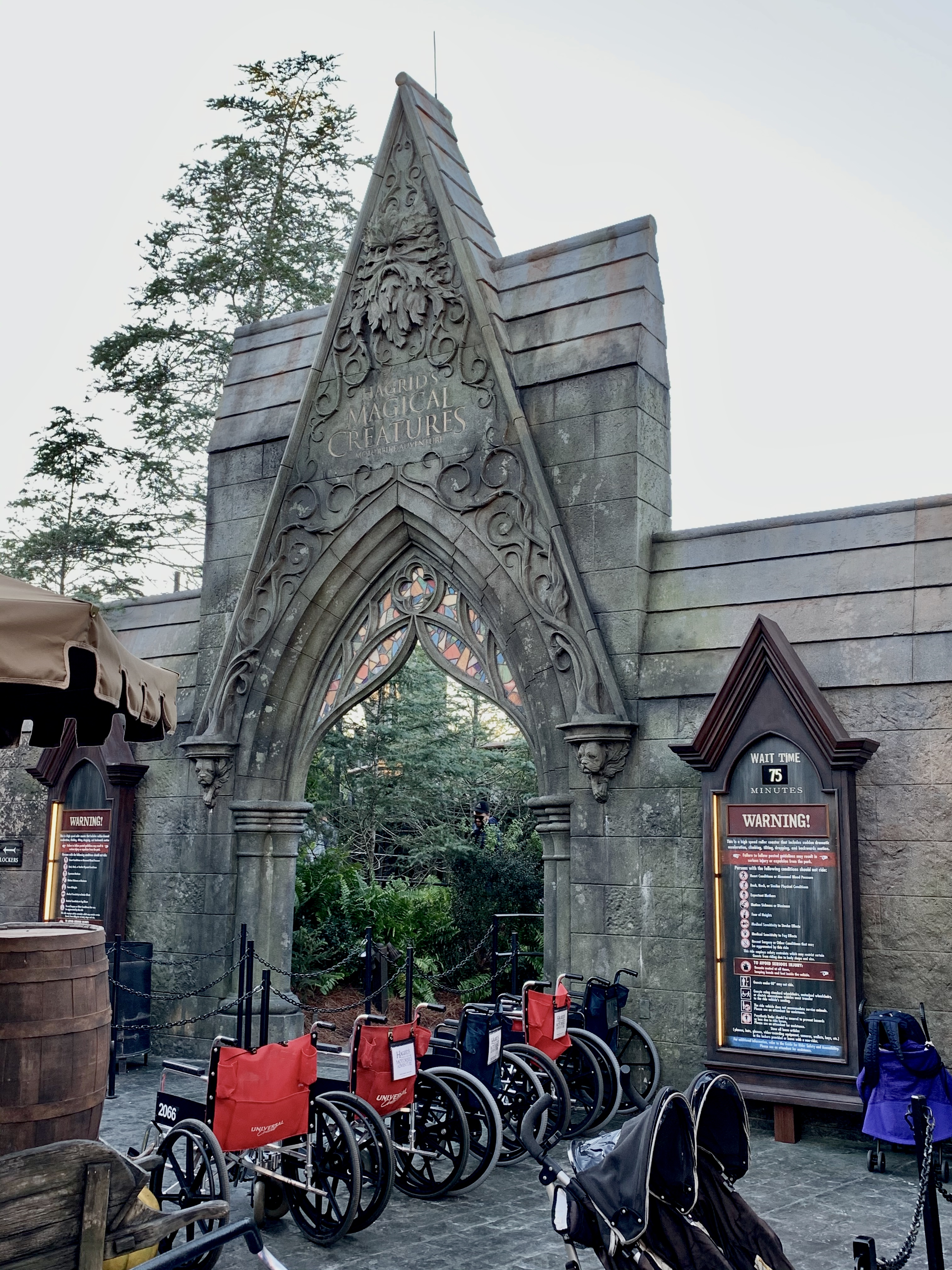
Entrance to Hagrid's Magical Creatures Motorbike Adventure

Dragon Challenge was an inverted roller coaster featuring two distinct tracks that overlapped and intertwined with each other. The coaster predated the Wizarding World of Harry Potter, having operated under the name Dueling Dragons since the park's 1999 opening. The tracks remained the same, but were renamed in homage to the first task of the Triwizard Tournament where Harry and the other contestants are each to duel with a dragon, depicted in chapter 20 of Harry Potter and the Goblet of Fire. The two sides of the coaster were renamed "Hungarian Horntail" and "Chinese Fireball", after two of the dragon breeds which appear in the book. It was the only chasing inverted roller coaster in the world. The queue for this ride featured many Harry Potter relics, including the Goblet of Fire and the Triwizard Cup. In addition, the hike to the ride featured Ron Weasley's flying Ford Anglia from in the second film, as well as Hagrid's hut. Dragon Challenge closed on September 4, 2017 to make way for Hagrid's Magical Creatures Motorbike Adventure, which opened on June 13, 2019.

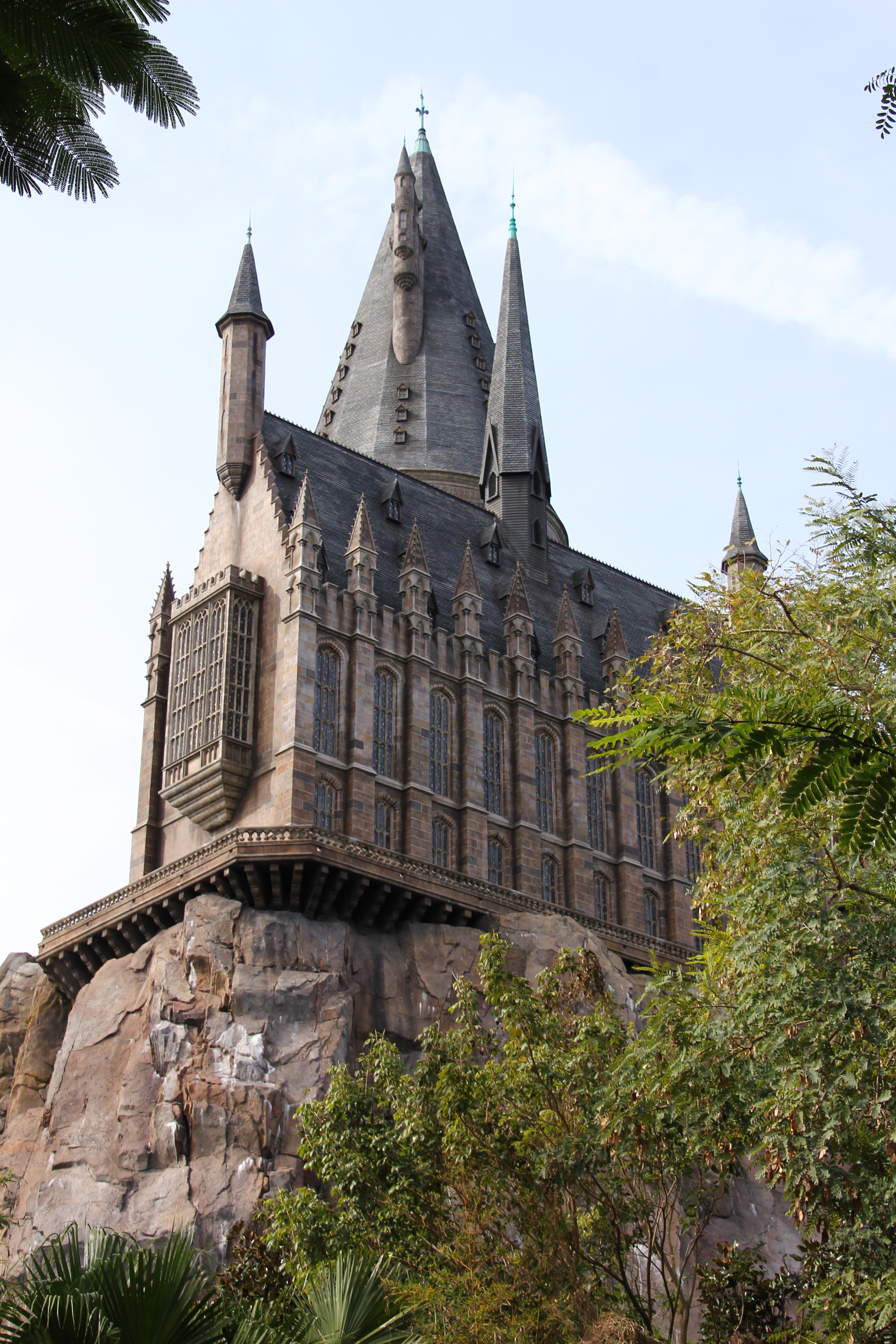
Hogwarts Castle exterior of Harry Potter and the Forbidden Journey.

Harry Potter and the Forbidden Journey is a dark ride inside the replica of Hogwarts Castle, simulating a tour of the castle and its surrounding grounds. Visitors initially walk through the castle, interacting with various characters and props from the Potter series, including a speech from Dumbledore, and directions from Harry, Hermione and Ron, before boarding a "magical bench" (controlled with a KUKA robotic arm system). Throughout the ride, guests are taken around the outside of the castle, using a combination of simulated flight as well as encountering realistic animatronic versions of the Whomping Willow, a horde of dementors, giant spiders, the Hungarian Horntail Dragon, and a Quidditch match.

Flight of the Hippogriff is a steel roller coaster designed for families, located adjacent to Harry Potter and the Forbidden Journey. The ride opened in 2000 as the Flying Unicorn. Similar to the Dragon Challenge, this ride was re-themed prior to the opening of the Wizarding World. The roller coaster's back-story is that Hogwarts's Care of Magical Creatures professor, Hagrid, is teaching young wizards to fly on a hippogriff (as Harry does in Harry Potter and the Prisoner of Azkaban) by using a wicker replica of the creature. A recreation of Hagrid's Hut is passed on the way for a lesson from Hagrid himself on how to properly approach a hippogriff.

A recreation of the Hogwarts Express lies at the entry to Hogsmeade. The recreation features "billowing steam and an iconic whistle" and is accompanied by the conductor of the train. In the Harry Potter series, the Hogwarts Express is the train used to transport students from King's Cross Station in London to Hogwarts. The "Owl Post" is a working post office (where postcards and letters will be delivered with an authentic Hogsmeade postmark) that also sells stationery, writing implements, stamps, and owl-related gifts.

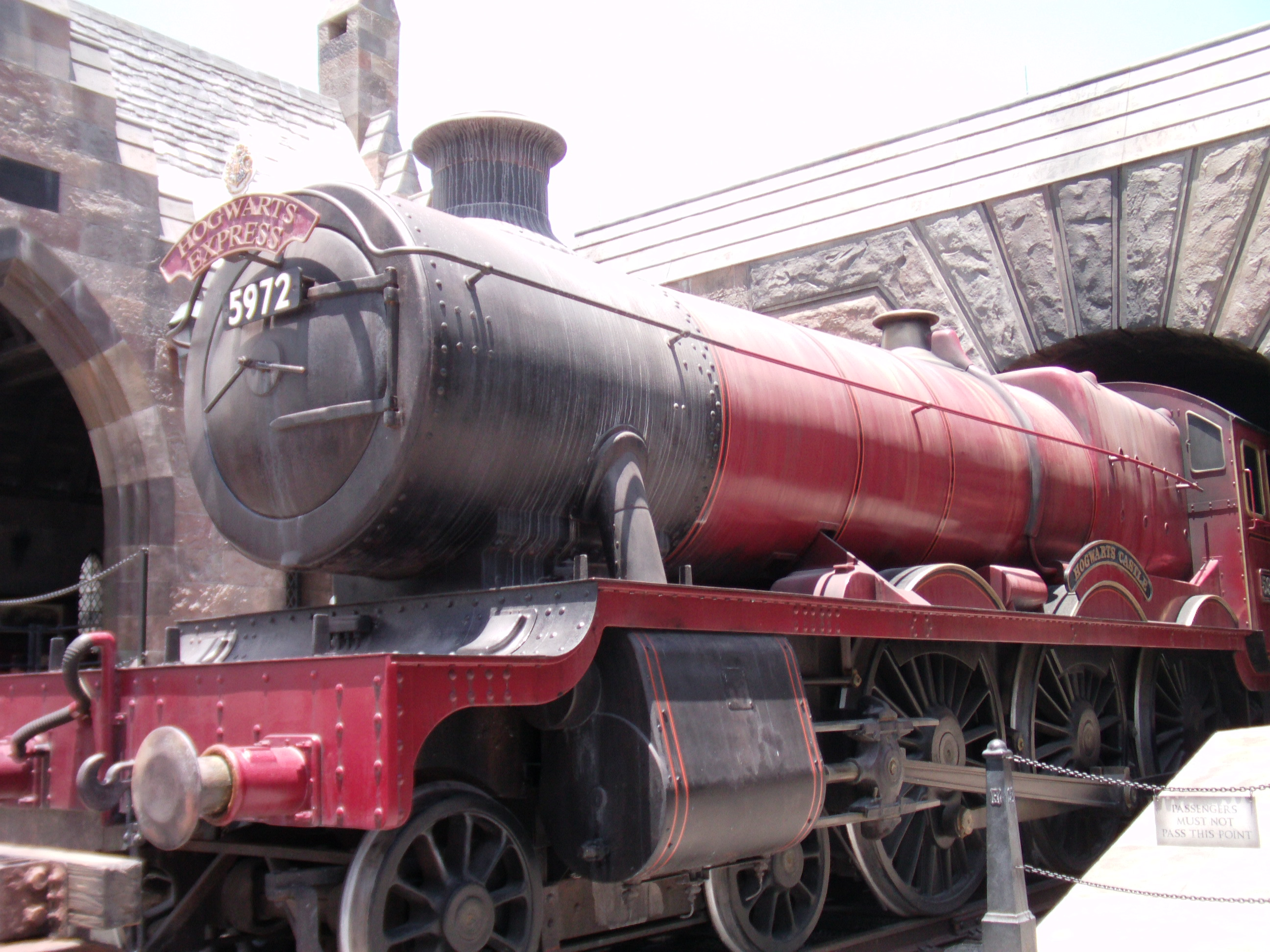
A recreation of the Hogwarts Express locomotive greets guests when entering Hogsmeade

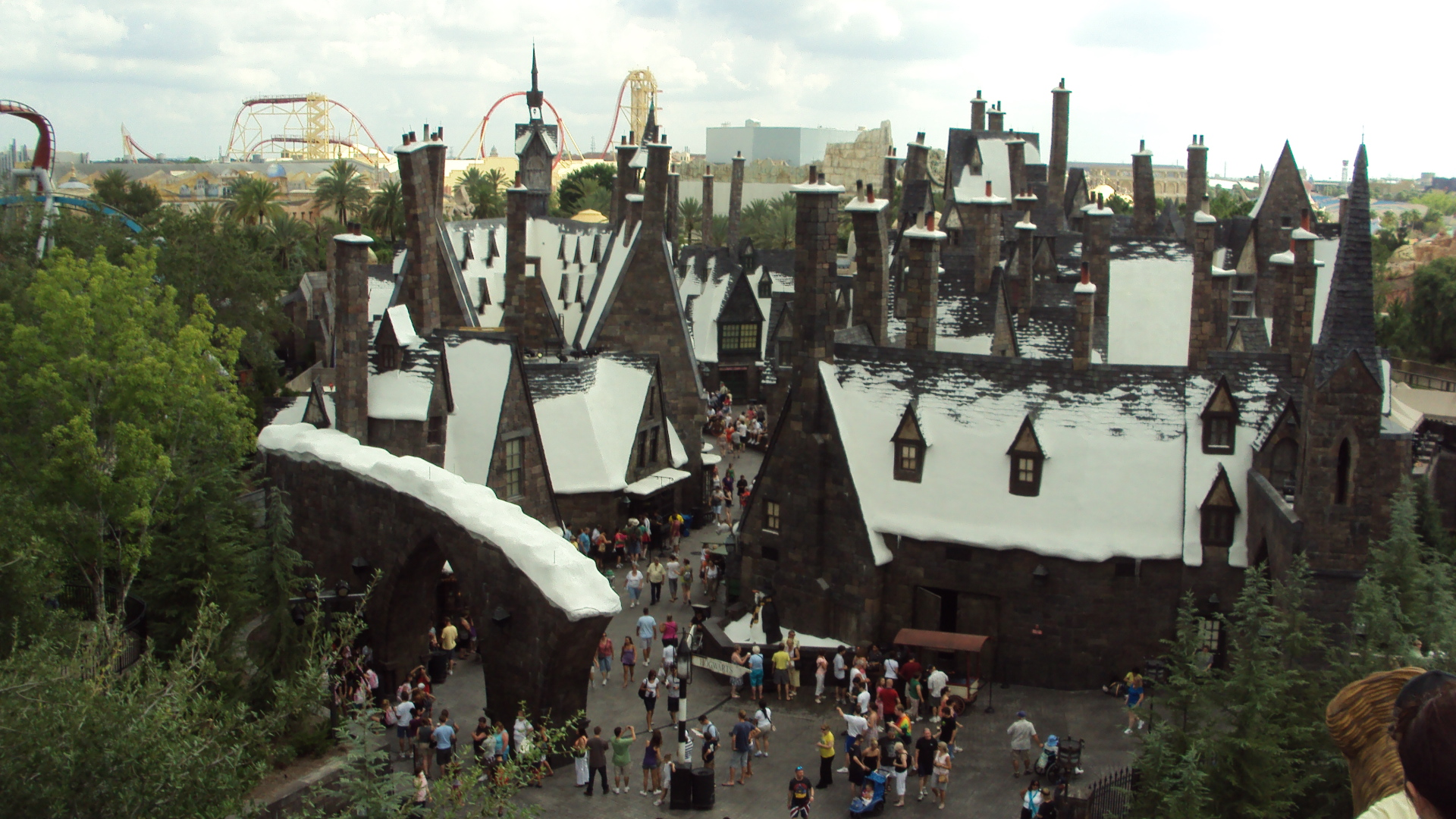
Hogsmeade village as seen from Flight of the Hippogriff, pictured in September 2010. Part of the track of the former Dragon Challenge (in blue and red) is seen in the upper left.

"The Three Broomsticks", based on the inn and pub from the Harry Potter series, offers a variety of food and beverage items from the Harry Potter series, including Butterbeer, pumpkin juice, strawberry-peanut butter ice cream (as seen in Harry Potter and the Prisoner of Azkaban), and chocolate Cauldron Cakes, in addition to a menu composed of traditional British fare (Shepherd's pie, fish and chips, etc.). The pub features many hidden references to the books and films, namely house elves and ghosts that roam the rafters. Butterbeer, which can be purchased with a souvenir mug, is offered as a non-alcoholic beverage and comes in both regular and frozen forms, found at the beginning of Hogsmeade fresh off the tap from the Butterbeer cart. Similarly, The Hog's Head is based on the pub from the Harry Potter series owned by Aberforth Dumbledore. Honeydukes is a sweet shop, based on the sweet shop of the same name in the Harry Potter series. The shop sells many confectionery items from the books and films, including Chocolate Frogs, Acid Pops, Exploding Bonbons, Cauldron Cakes, treacle fudge, Fizzing Whizzbees, Black Pepper Imps, and Bertie Bott's Every Flavour Beans.

Various Harry Potter merchandise items can be purchased from two different gift shops in Hogsmeade. Dervish and Banges is a store selling magical items, as well as Quidditch supplies, Hogwarts clothing, and other merchandise. The store is based on Dervish and Banges in the Harry Potter series. The second shop is Filch's Emporium of Confiscated Goods, a general gift shop (named for Hogwarts caretaker Argus Filch) offering Hogwarts souvenirs (such as clothing and stationery), replicas of props from the Harry Potter films, and other toys and souvenirs. The shop is located at the exit to Harry Potter and the Forbidden Journey, and is where guests can obtain photos of their ride experience.

Name	Type of Attraction
Flight of the Hippogriff	Ride
Hagrid's Magical Creature Motorbike Adventure	Ride
Harry Potter and the Forbidden Journey	Ride
Hogwarts Express - Hogsmeade Station	Ride
Dragon Challenge (permanently closed)	Ride
Frog Choir	Show
Ollivanders Experience in Hogsmeade	Show
The Nighttime Lights at Hogwarts Castle (permanently closed)	Show
Hogwarts Always	Show
Dark Arts at Hogwarts Castle (seasonals)	Show
The Magic of Christmas at Hogwarts (seasonals)	Show
Triwizard Spirit Rally	Show
Hog's Head	Dining
Three Broomsticks	Dining
Dervish and Banges	Shops
Filch's Emporium of Confiscated Goods	Shops
Honeydukes	Shops
Ollivanders Wand Shop in Hogsmeade	Shops
Owl Post & Owlery	Shops
Gladrags Wizardwear	Shops
Zonko's Joke Shop	Shops

=== Diagon Alley at Universal Studios Florida ===
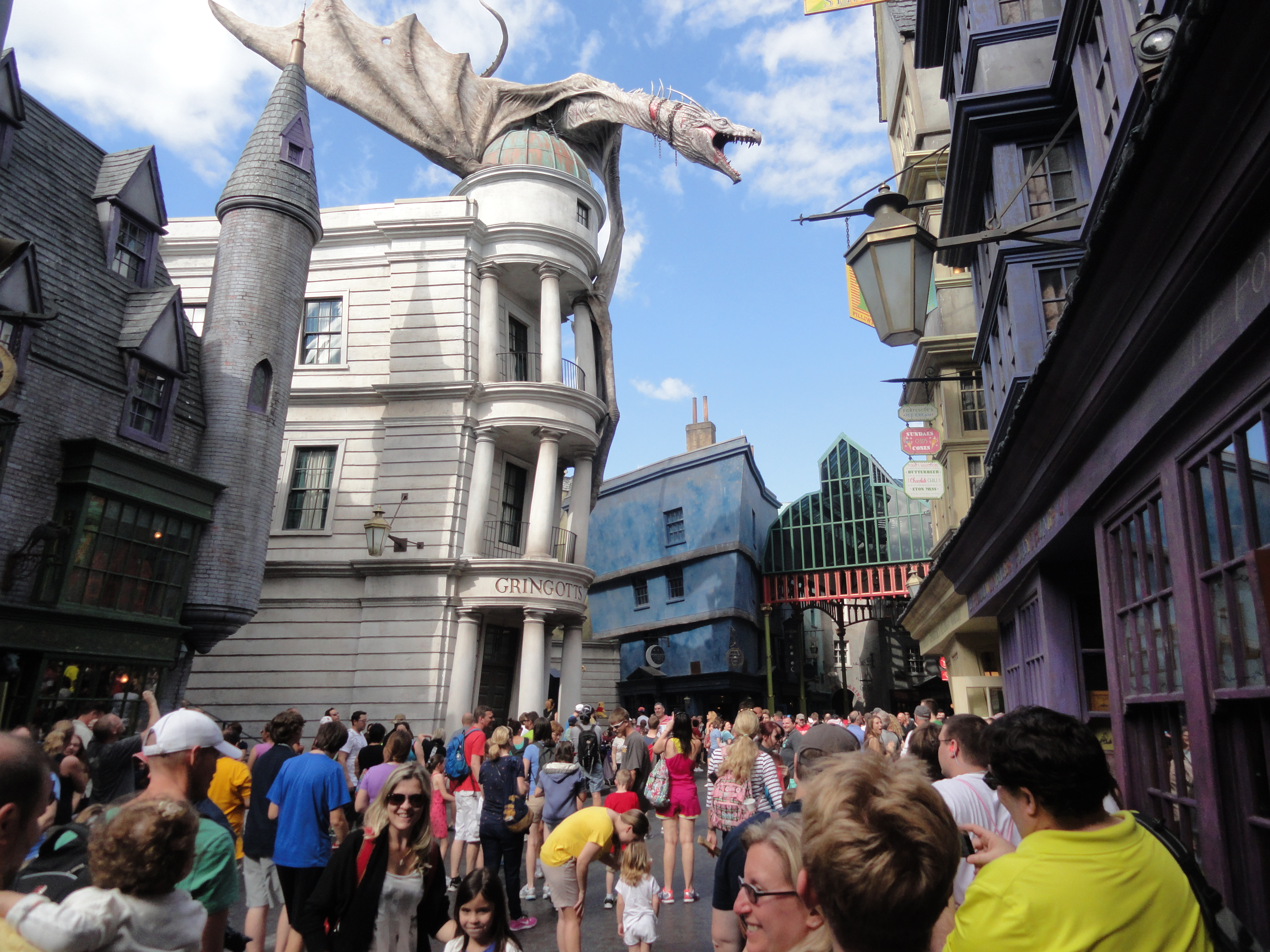
Gringotts Bank, which houses Harry Potter and the Escape from Gringotts

Diagon Alley's flagship ride is Harry Potter and the Escape from Gringotts, a 3-D motion-based steel roller coaster dark ride based around Gringotts Bank, the wizarding bank in Diagon Alley. Riders enter the bank into the queue area where Blordak greets visitors and instructs them to continue past him to travel deep into the vaults of the bank to open an account. Unlike Harry Potter and the Forbidden Journey, this ride is hosted by Bill Weasley, played by Domhnall Gleeson, reprising his role from Harry Potter and the Deathly Hallows – Part 1 and Part 2.

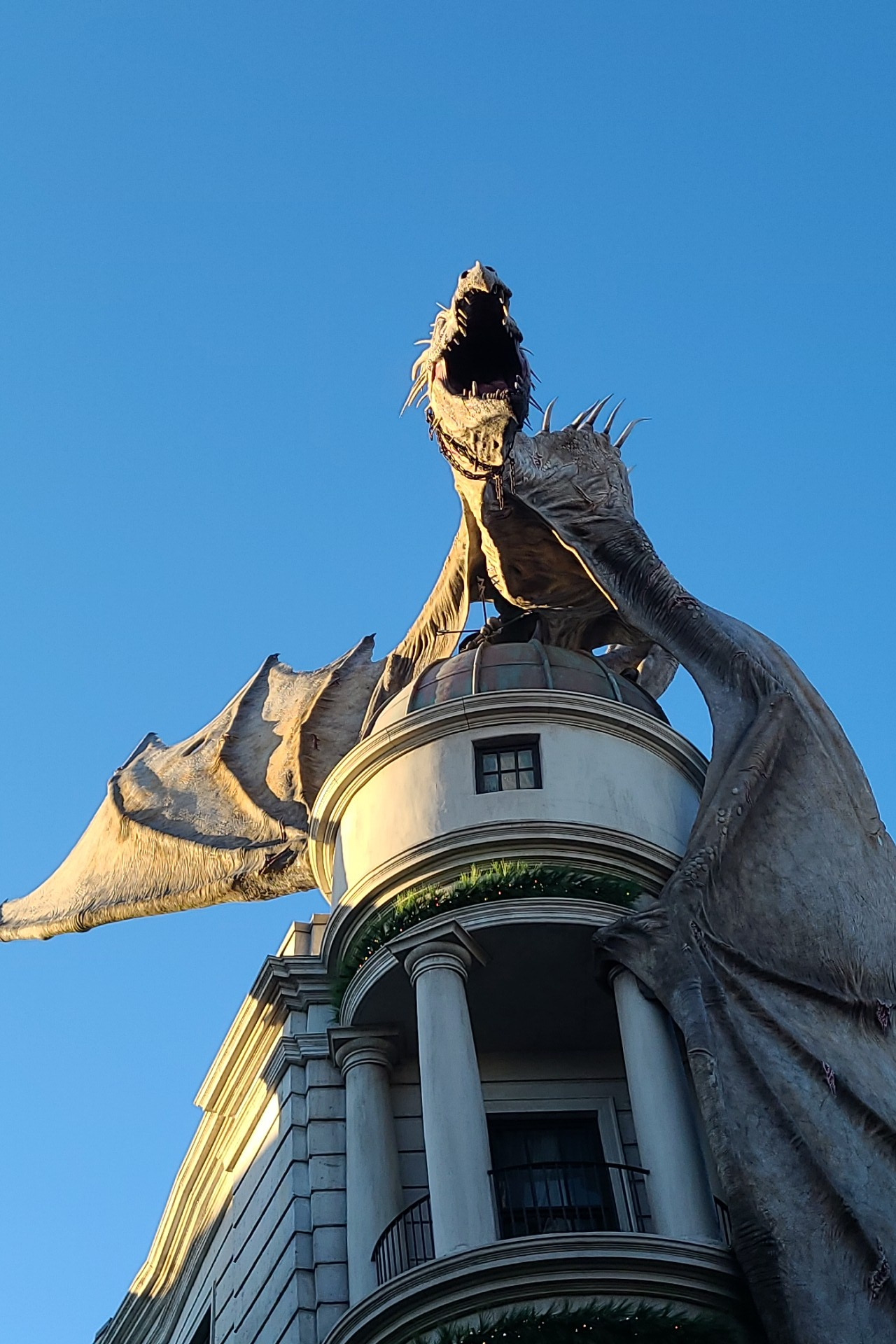
Ukrainian Ironbelly dragon sitting on top of the Gringotts Wizarding Bank in The Wizarding World of Harry Potter, Universal Studios Orlando

A completely functioning full-scale replica of the Hogwarts Express was created for the Diagon Alley expansion, connecting King's Cross Station at Universal Studios Florida to the Hogsmeade station at Islands of Adventure, manufactured by Doppelmayr Garaventa Group in the form of a funicular railway people mover. The Hogwarts Express King's Cross Station features a wall between Platforms 9 and 10, where guests can "walk through" to get to Platform 9 3/4, like in the first film.

Live events at Diagon Alley include the Knight Bus interactive experience at the London waterfront; "The Fountain of Fair Fortune" and "The Tale of The Three Brothers," which are puppet shows enacting stories from The Tales of Beedle the Bard; and live performances from musical group Celestina Warbeck and the Banshees (mentioned briefly by Molly Weasley in Harry Potter and the Chamber of Secrets).

Gringotts Money Exchange is able to exchange American currency for Wizarding bank notes. Diagon Alley features The Leaky Cauldron restaurant, The Hopping Pot, and Florean Fortescue's Ice Cream Parlour, which specializes in Butterbeer-flavored ice cream. The Fountain of Fair Fortune is also a bar. Ollivander's Wand Shop sells interactive wands that activate features all around Diagon Alley, Quality Quidditch Supplies, Weasleys' Wizard Wheezes joke shop, Magical Menagerie, Madam Malkin's Robes for All Occasions, Wiseacre's Wizarding Equipment. Borgin and Burkes is the only shop located in Knockturn Alley.

Name	Type of Attraction
Harry Potter and the Escape from Gringotts	Ride
Hogwarts Express - King's Cross Station	Ride
Celestina Warbeck and the Banshees	Show
Knight Bus	Show
Ollivanders Experience in Diagon Alley	Show
The Tales of Beedle the Bard	Show
Florean Fortescue's Ice-Cream Parlour	Dining
Leaky Cauldron	Dining
The Fountain of Fair Fortune	Dining
The Hopping Pot	Dining
Borgin and Burkes	Shops
Gringotts Money Exchange	Shops
Madam Malkin's Robes for All Occasions	Shops
Ollivanders Wand Shop in Diagon Alley	Shops
Quality Quidditch Supplies	Shops
Scribbulus	Shops
Shutterbutton's Photography Studio	Shops
Sugarplum's Sweetshop	Shops
Wands by Gregorovitch	Shops
Weasley's Wizard Wheezes	Shops
Wiseacre's Wizarding Equipment	Shops

=== Ministry of Magic at Epic Universe ===
The Wizarding World of Harry Potter - Ministry of Magic takes place in 1920s 'Place Cachée' (French for 'Hidden Place'), the French version of Diagon Alley from the Fantastic Beasts films. The land has one ride and a theatrical stage show. The flagship ride, Harry Potter and the Battle at the Ministry, brings riders to the 1990s British Ministry of Magic via the Floo network and a time turner, where they become involved in the trial of Dolores Umbridge. The ride vehicle and mechanisms are similar to The Amazing Adventures of Spider-Man and Transformers: The Ride – 3D at the existing Universal Orlando parks, sitting atop a scissor lift, in addition to other traditional dark ride elements.

The stage show, Le Cirque Arcanus, involves a ringmaster stealing Newt Scamander's suitcase full of magical creatures in order to bring his circus back to its former glory. The show involves live performers, puppetry, special effects, and more.

Name	Type of Attraction
Le Cirque Arcanus	Show
Café L'air De la Sirène	Dining
Harry Potter and the Battle at the Ministry	Ride
Cosme Acajor Baguettes Magiques	Shops

=== Interactive Wands ===
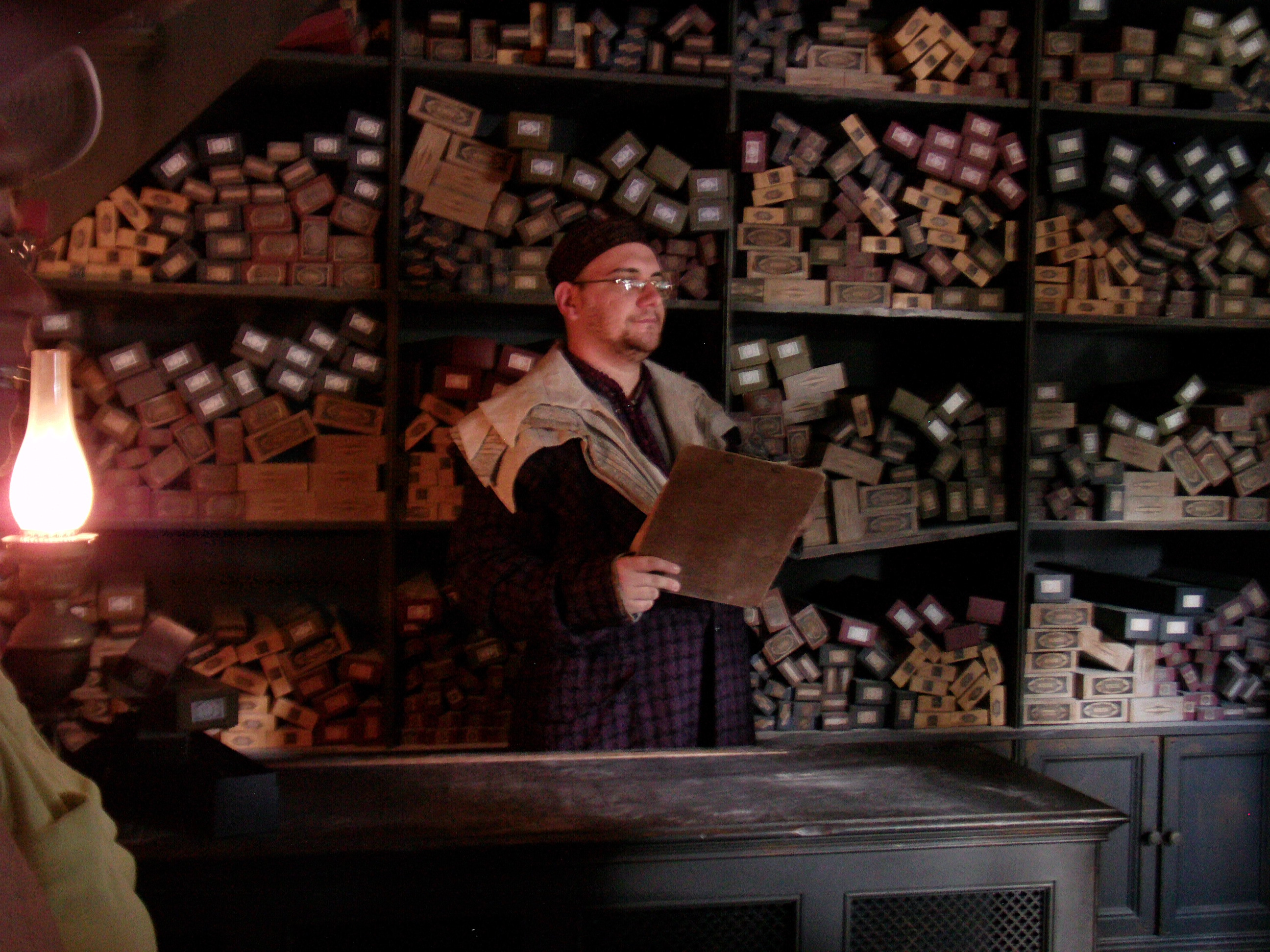
Inside Ollivanders wand shop

In the book series, Ollivanders wand shop is located in Diagon Alley, not Hogsmeade; however, installations of the shop are present in both the Hogsmeade and Diagon Alley areas of the Wizarding World of Harry Potter. The Hogsmeade area recreated the shop as "Ollivanders", portraying it as a branch of the original where Harry purchases his wand in Harry Potter and the Philosopher's Stone (known in the United States as Harry Potter and the Sorcerer's Stone). The shop includes an interactive experience where visitors are admitted in groups of 20 to experience the premise that "the wand chooses the wizard". Similar to what is shown in the first film, the wand keeper and a selected guest test a variety of wands until the right one is found. Effects include flowers drying out or a thunderstorm erupting inside the shop. Shoppers, regardless of whether they attended the interactive experience, can purchase souvenir wands.

== Reception ==
The Wizarding World of Harry Potter has been well received by Harry Potter fans. Matt Blum of Wired stated "every detail is finely crafted to enhance the experience". An Orlando Sentinel article stated "Muggles will love their Harry Potter adventure" but identifies the need for the park to offer Universal Express Passes due to large crowds. It also stated Harry Potter and the Forbidden Journey is a truly one-of-a-kind experience that cannot easily be described.

Boris Johnson, then Mayor of London, expressed his "jealous irritation" at the fact that the park was chosen to be in Orlando, rather than in London, stating that it was "utterly mad" to leave it to the Americans "to make money from a great British invention" along with his hopes that a similar theme park would come to London.

== See also ==
- The Wizarding World of Harry Potter
- The Wizarding World of Harry Potter (Universal Studios Hollywood)
- The Wizarding World of Harry Potter (Universal Studios Japan)
- The Wizarding World of Harry Potter (Universal Studios Beijing)
- Warner Bros. Studio Tour London – The Making of Harry Potter
