= Harry Potter and the Escape from Gringotts =

Ride at Universal Studios Florida

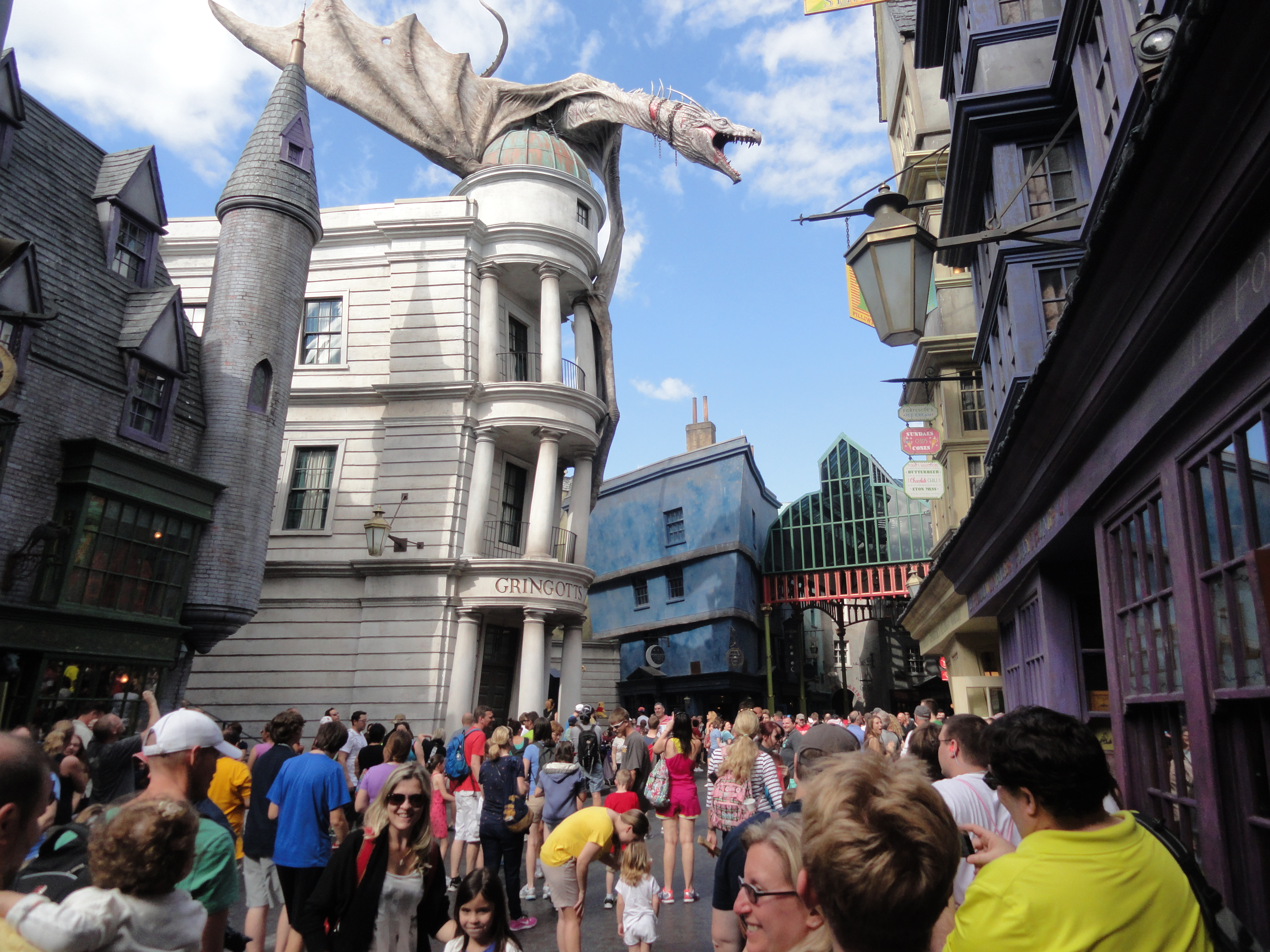
- Ukrainian Ironbelly atop of Gringotts Bank which houses Harry Potter and the Escape from Gringotts

Universal Studios Florida
- Location: Universal Studios Florida
- Park section: The Wizarding World of Harry Potter - Diagon Alley
- Coordinates: 28°28′49″N 81°28′12″W
- Status: Operating
- Opening date: July 8, 2014; 12 years ago
- Replaced: Jaws: The Ride (San Francisco)

General statistics
- Type: Steel – Launched – Enclosed
- Manufacturer: Intamin
- Designer: Universal Creative
- Lift/launch system: Drive tire launch
- Length: 2,000 ft (610 m)
- Site area: 75,000 sq ft (7,000 m^{2})
- Inversions: 0
- Duration: 5:00
- Max vertical angle: 50°
- Height restriction: 42 in (107 cm)
- Trains: 11 trains with 2 cars; riders arranged 4 across in 3 rows for a total of 24 riders per train
- Theme: Gringotts Bank (Harry Potter)
- Pre-ride host: Bill Weasley
- Ride host: Bill Weasley
- Universal Express available
- Single rider line available
- Must transfer from wheelchair
- Harry Potter and the Escape from Gringotts at RCDB

Harry Potter and the Escape from Gringotts is an indoor steel roller coaster designed by Universal Creative and built by Intamin at Universal Studios Florida, a theme park located within the Universal Orlando Resort. Similar to dark rides, the roller coaster utilizes special effects in a controlled-lighting environment and also employs motion-based 3-D projection of both animation and live-action sequences to enhance the experience. The ride is themed to Gringotts Wizarding Bank, as depicted in the Harry Potter films, and became the flagship attraction for the expanded Wizarding World of Harry Potter – Diagon Alley when it opened on July 8, 2014.

== History ==
Universal Parks & Resorts, in partnership with Warner Bros., officially announced the addition of The Wizarding World of Harry Potter to Islands of Adventure on May 31, 2007. The area officially opened in the Islands of Adventure theme park on June 18, 2010. The Harry Potter-themed area saw attendance at Islands of Adventure rise by as much as 36% in 2010. According to Jason Garcia of the Orlando Sentinel, this led to resort executives pondering "when to expand Wizarding World and how to keep business balanced between Islands and Universal Studios Florida". In April 2011, Brady MacDonald of the Los Angeles Times speculated that an area expansion would include the addition of Diagon Alley and a Gringotts-themed dark ride in place of the Lost Continent themed area in the park.

On December 6, 2011, Universal park officials confirmed that an expansion would take place and described it as "significant". The announcement was made four days after the park confirmed the removal of Jaws, a ride scheduled to close permanently on January 2, 2012. Demolition of the Jaws ride and the surrounding Amity area began soon after its closure. After the site was levelled, work began on land reclamation as well as the construction of a series of buildings, including a large show building for the Gringotts ride.

Further details about the expansion were announced on May 8, 2013, confirming new feature attractions themed after Diagon Alley and London. On January 23, 2014, the name of the area's flagship attraction was revealed to be Harry Potter and the Escape from Gringotts. It was later described as a "virtual reality roller coaster" by Entertainment Weekly as additional details were released in May 2014. The new ride opened on July 8, 2014, alongside other attractions in the new Diagon Alley section of the park. The building housing the attraction features a 60-foot (18 m) dragon statue perched over the entrance that utilizes special effects to simulate the breathing of fire. Upon opening, the wait times would reach up to seven hours long.

== Ride experience ==
Harry Potter and the Escape from Gringotts is an indoor steel roller coaster with a track length of approximately 2,000 feet (610 m). The ride encompasses motion-based vehicles, detailed sets, physical effects, and 3D projection screens similar to those found on Transformers: The Ride – 3D and The Amazing Adventures of Spider-Man. The ride's storyline is set during the early events portrayed in Harry Potter and the Deathly Hallows – Part 2, when Harry Potter, Ron Weasley and Hermione Granger are attempting to infiltrate Gringotts Bank in order to retrieve a Horcrux as part of their mission to defeat Lord Voldemort.

=== Queue ===
The queue begins through the lobby of Gringotts Wizarding Bank, where Bogrod, one of the bank's tellers, awaits guests who are visiting the bank to open an account. There is a large extended outdoor queue area that is used on busier days, that can stretch up to 2.5 miles in length. After Bogrod clears the guests to visit the vaults, they walk toward a security check to have their ID picture taken (this picture is in lieu of an on-ride photo, and can be purchased afterward). After getting clearance, guests pass tables laid out with issues of The Daily Prophet newspaper that display prominent headlines from the final Harry Potter film, including the death of Albus Dumbledore and the ascent of Severus Snape as Headmaster of Hogwarts. The queue continues down a corridor lined with offices used by the bank's goblin employees. In one of the offices, silhouettes of Harry Potter, Ron Weasley, Hermione Granger (disguised by Polyjuice Potion as Bellatrix Lestrange), and Griphook can be seen and heard as they plot to infiltrate one of the bank's vaults to retrieve an unmentioned item. Continuing through the queue, guests enter Bill Weasley's office, where they are welcomed by the goblin Blordak and eventually joined by Bill. Blordak directs the guests toward the vaults; after exiting the office, guests wait at the door of an elevator simulation that will take them there, while a moving portrait of a goblin explains the safety precautions of the ride. Upon taking the elevator "down" to the vaults, guests pick up cart goggles and ascend a flight of stairs to the cart loading station.

=== Ride ===
After guests board their cart, the vehicle races along the tracks, just before security alarms go off as a security breach is detected and the bank goes on lockdown. Bellatrix Lestrange appears, after being notified of an impostor infiltration, and decides to torture the guests by cutting off the track and tilting it down. This sends the cart speeding toward the vaults as stalagmites can be seen to give an impression of being deep underground in the vaults. Bill Weasley casts Arresto Momentum to stop the cart just before Harry, Ron, Hermione, Griphook and Bogrod emerge from the Thief's Downfall, which has washed away the Polyjuice Potion's effect off Hermione. Their cart drops them from a high altitude as security trolls climb up, pushing Bill and Blordak off their cart.

A security troll pushes the guests' cart further, past the Thief's Downfall and stops in front of more security trolls. One of them is hit by a mace but hangs on to the guests' cart and sends them falling. Bill casts Arresto Momentum again to stop the cart from falling, followed by Aguamenti to stop the Ukrainian Ironbelly dragon from breathing fire on the guests (the audience gets sprayed with water at this point) and Wingardium Leviosa, sending guests' through the vaults, in order to help them escape. Meanwhile, Harry, Ron and Hermione are attempting to escape the vaults on the Ukrainian Ironbelly. Blordak urges guests to seek shelter inside one of the vaults.

After entering the vault, the walls come crashing down and Nagini appears in an attempt to attack guests. Bellatrix reappears, this time with Lord Voldemort, who confronts guests and questions them on their knowledge of Harry Potter's whereabouts. He blames Bellatrix for the vault infiltration, who again decides to torture guests sending them to a lava-filled chamber deep in the vaults. To further torture guests into revealing Harry Potter's whereabouts, Voldemort decides to administer "a little dose of pain to help you remember" and conjures a ball of fire. The Ukrainian Ironbelly crashes in from the opposite side, and Harry casts a counterspell, while the dragon spits fire towards Voldemort, who shields himself and Bellatrix and both later furiously retreat. Hermione casts a spell to hook the cart to the dragon in order to get guests safely out of the vaults and Ron casts Confringo to create an escape route. The cart is then launched through the escape route and Harry orders Hermione to cut the cart loose, away from peril. In the final scene, Harry asks Bill to take care of the guests as he acknowledges the retrieval of the Horcrux, which is the item that went unmentioned in the beginning, and Bill bids the guests farewell.

== Cast ==
Harry Potter and the Escape from Gringotts features characters of the film series, which were reprised by their respective actors, except for Daniel Radcliffe, Emma Watson and Warwick Davis, who were involved in other film projects. Their likenesses as Harry Potter, Hermione Granger and Griphook, respectively, are present in the attraction as they appeared in the final Harry Potter film. Harry and Hermione are voice dubbed by other actors, while Griphook has no dialogue in the attraction.

- Domhnall Gleeson as Bill Weasley
- Helena Bonham Carter as Bellatrix Lestrange
- Adam Sopp as Harry Potter (voice double)
- Rupert Grint as Ron Weasley
- Ralph Fiennes as Lord Voldemort
- Jon Key as Bogrod. Key voices the goblin for the animatronic Bogrod in the bank's lobby, while his likeness as the character is present in the attraction in a silent role.
- Jimmy Vee as Gringotts Goblin

== Awards ==
In Amusement Today's annual Golden Ticket Awards, Harry Potter and the Escape from Gringotts has made it into the Top Five Dark Rides on five occasions since it opened in 2014.

Golden Ticket Awards: Best Dark Ride
Year	2014	2015	2016	2017	2018
Ranking	4	3	2	5	5

Golden Ticket Awards: Best New Ride for 2014
Ranking	4

== Gallery ==
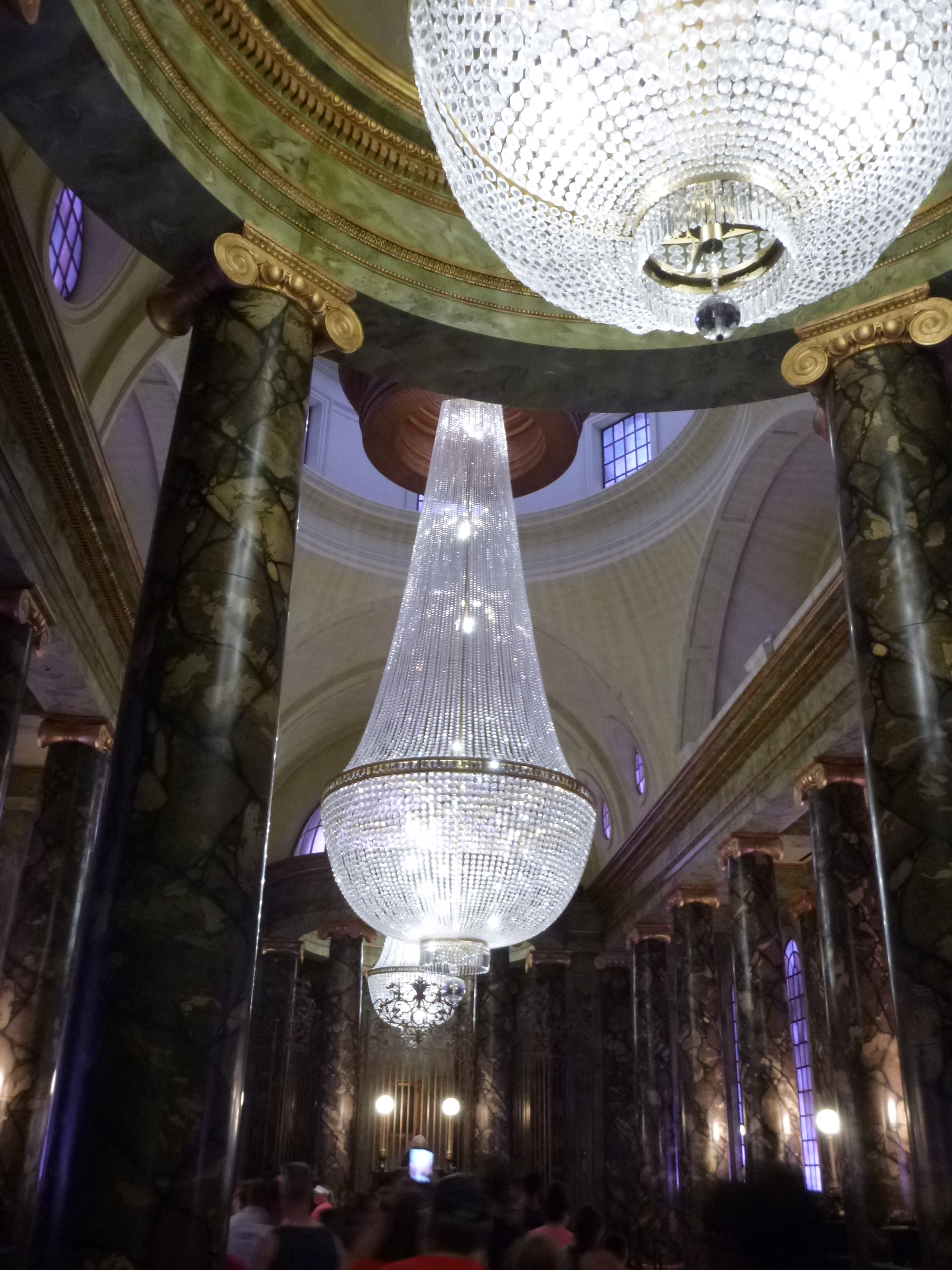
Gringotts Wizarding Bank queue

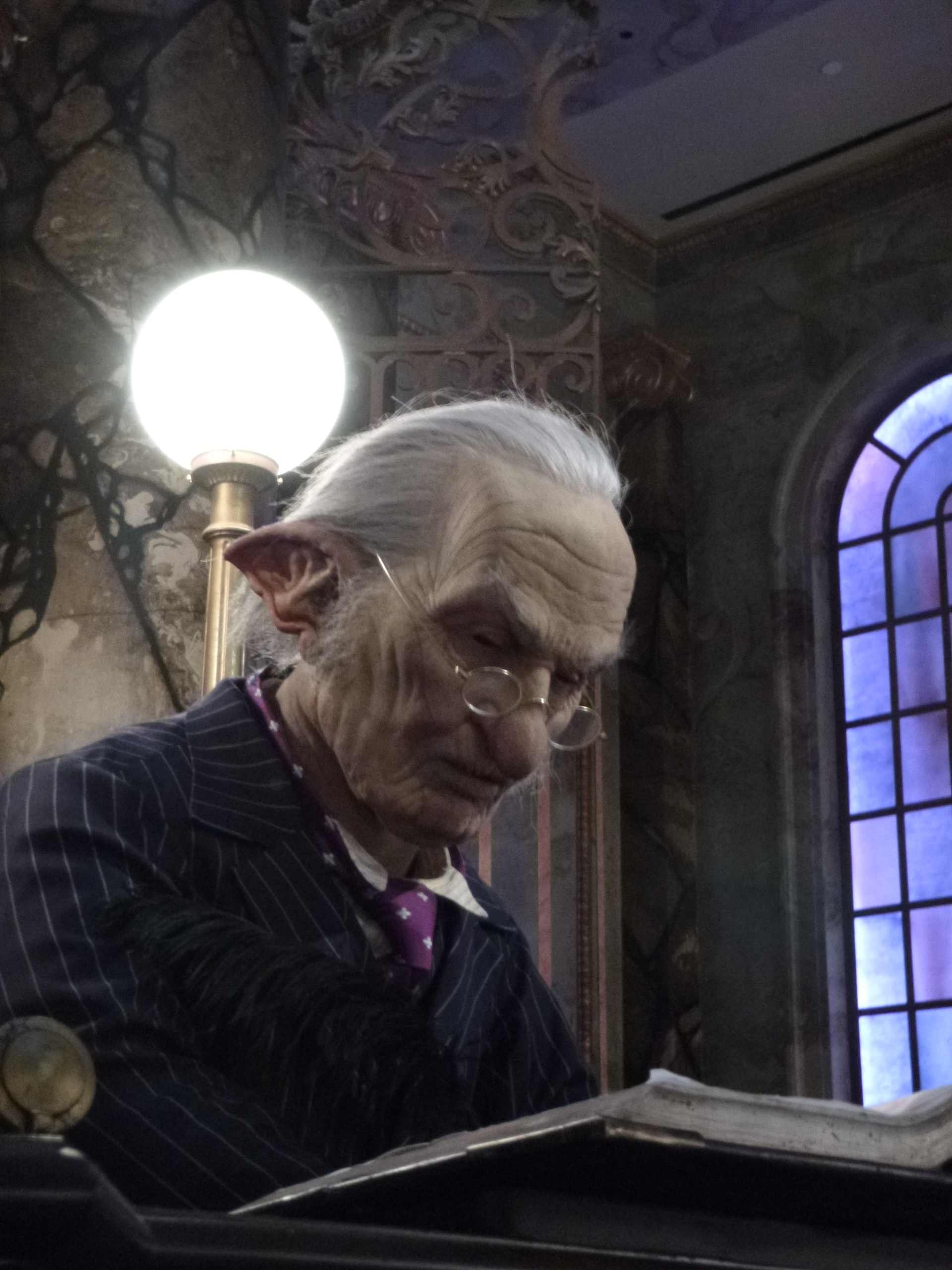
Animatronic Bogrod at Gringotts Wizarding Bank

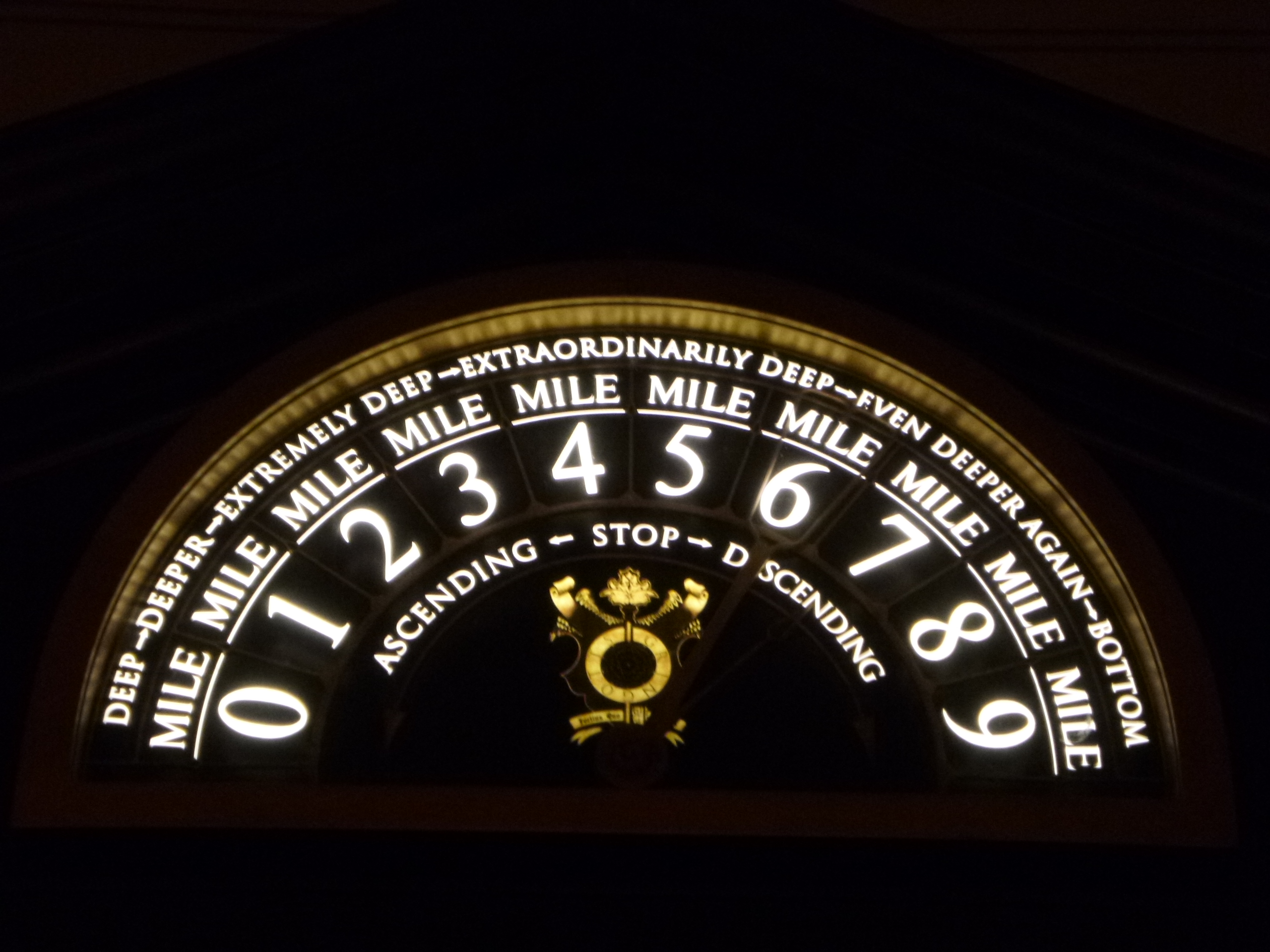
Elevator to the cave

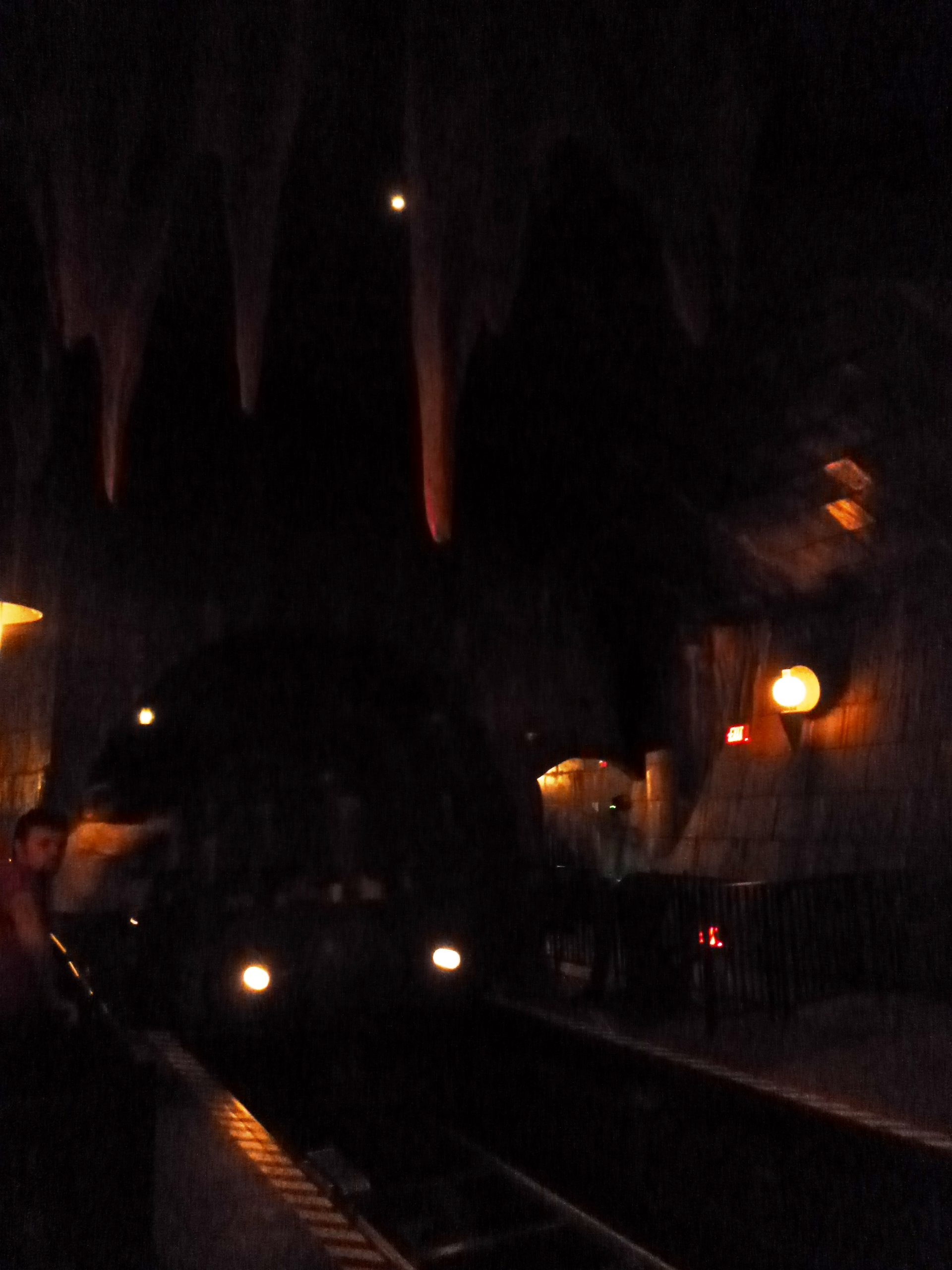
Boarding station of the ride

== See also ==
- Harry Potter and the Forbidden Journey, a motion dark ride located at Universal Islands of Adventure
- Hagrid's Magical Creatures Motorbike Adventure, a themed roller coaster located at sister park Universal Islands of Adventure
- List of Universal Orlando Resort attractions
