= Greg Dyke =

British media executive (born 1947)

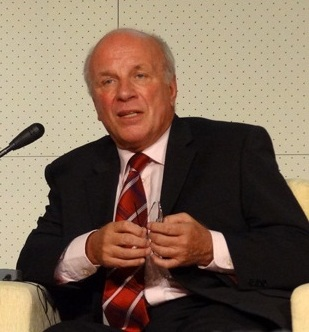
- Dyke in 2011

13th Director-General of the BBC
- In office 2000 – 29 January 2004
- Preceded by: John Birt
- Succeeded by: Mark Byford (acting)

Chancellor of the University of York
- In office 2004–2015
- Preceded by: Janet Baker
- Succeeded by: Malcolm Grant

Chairman of Brentford Football Club
- In office 2006–2013

Chairman of the British Film Institute
- In office 2008–2016
- Preceded by: Anthony Minghella
- Succeeded by: Josh Berger

Chairman of the Football Association
- In office 2013–2016
- Preceded by: David Bernstein
- Succeeded by: Greg Clarke

Vice President for Television of BAFTA
- In office 2016–2021
- Preceded by: Sophie Turner Laing
- Succeeded by: Dame Pippa Harris

Chairman of the London Film School
- Incumbent
- Assumed office 2018
- Preceded by: Mike Leigh

Personal details
- Born: Gregory Dyke; 20 May 1947 (age 79) Hayes, Middlesex, England
- Spouse: Susan Howes
- Children: 4
- Education: Derwent College, York
- Occupation: Journalist, broadcaster, Executive director
- Greg Dyke's voice Recorded January 2009 from the BBC Radio 4 programme You and Yours

Gregory Dyke (born 20 May 1947) is a British media executive, football administrator, journalist and broadcaster. Since the 1960s, Dyke has had a long career in the UK in print and then broadcast journalism. He is credited with introducing "tabloid" television to British broadcasting, and reviving the ratings of TV-am. In the 1990s, he held chief executive positions at LWT Group, Pearson Television, and Channel 5.

Dyke was director-general of the BBC from January 2000 to January 2004; he resigned following heavy criticism of the BBC's news reporting process in the Hutton Inquiry. He was also a director of Manchester United and chairman of Brentford football clubs, and from 2013 to 2016 was chairman of the Football Association. He was chancellor of the University of York from 2004 to 2015 and chairman of the British Film Institute between 2008 and 2016. He also was the chairman of children's television company HiT Entertainment, and was a panellist on Sky News's The Pledge.

Since 2016, Dyke has been vice president for television of BAFTA. In 2018, he became chairman of London Film School.

== Early life and education ==
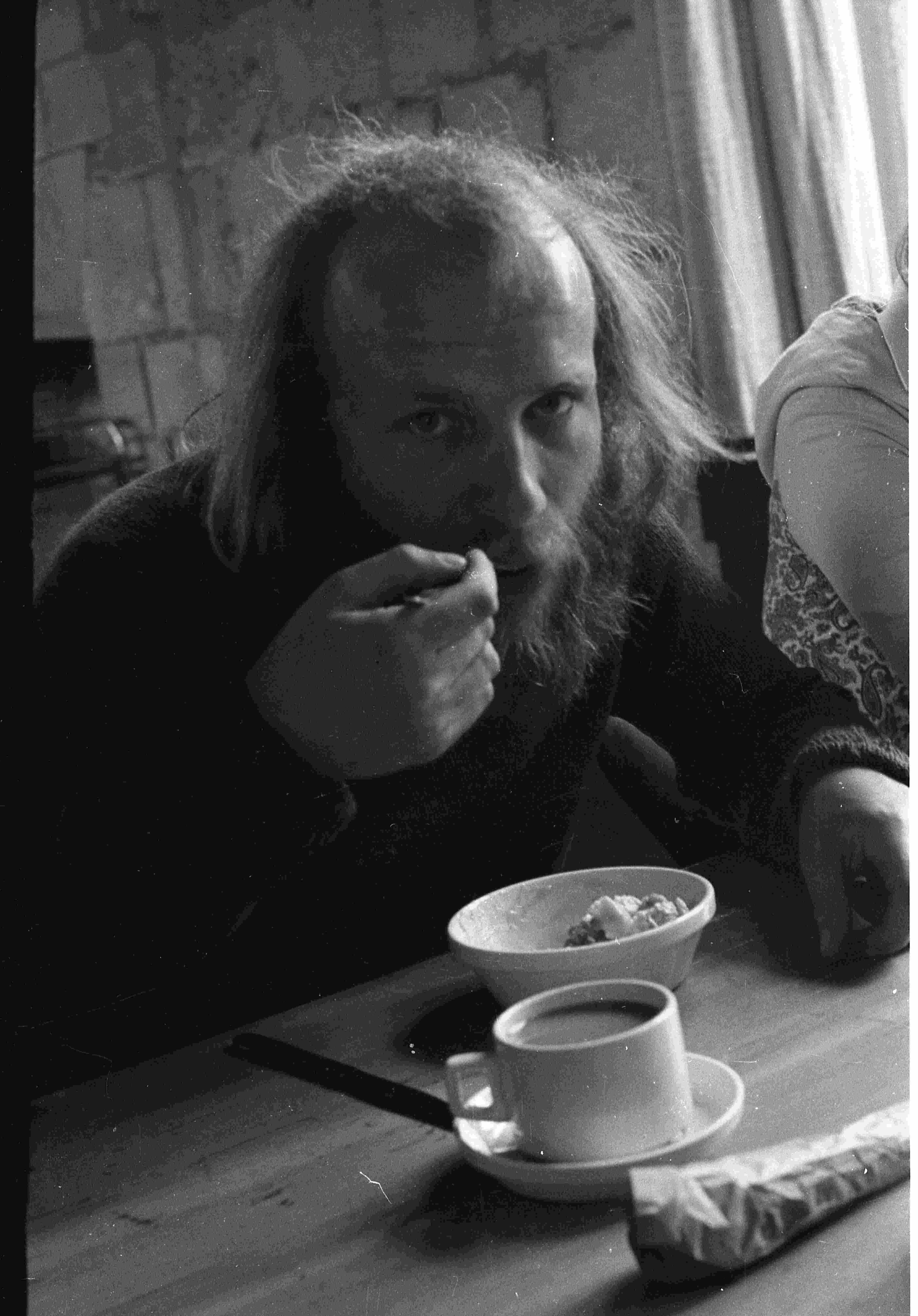
Dyke at the University of York, 1975

Greg Dyke was born in 1947, in Hayes, Middlesex, the youngest of three sons in a "stable, lower middle class" family. His father was an insurance salesman. The family lived at 17 Cerne Close until Dyke was nine years old, then moved to Cedars Drive, Hillingdon. He was educated at Yeading Primary School and then Hayes Grammar School, which he left with one grade "E" at A-level mathematics. After school, he was briefly a trainee manager at Marks & Spencer, before leaving to work as a trainee reporter for the Hillingdon Mirror, becoming chief reporter in eight months. He left the Mirror after attempting to stage a union-backed protest against poor pay conditions by the junior staff on the paper. He then got a job at the Slough Evening Mail. Among his colleagues was future music journalist Colin Irwin.

Dyke then went on to study for a degree at the University of York as a mature student, graduating in 1974 with a bachelor's degree in politics. During his time at York, Dyke was active in student politics, and was part of a collective that produced a psychedelic underground student magazine called Nouse. He also met and married his first wife, Christine Taylor, whilst at the university. His contemporaries and friends at York included future journalists Linda Grant and Peter Hitchens, the latter then active in the International Socialists. Dyke was awarded an honorary doctorate from the university in 1999 and was chancellor from 2004 to 2015.

== Career ==
=== Break into television: LWT and TV-AM ===
After university, Dyke followed his first wife to Newcastle. He had become disillusioned with newspaper journalism, and tried for a job as a junior reporter at BBC Radio Teesside. He was unsuccessful, apparently because the interviewers felt no-one would understand his accent. Dyke instead found work covering rural affairs for the Newcastle Journal. He moved back to London with Christine in 1974 to become campaign officer for the Wandsworth Community Relations Council. He hated the job and left to campaign to be elected GLC Councillor for Putney. Again he was unsuccessful.

Dyke was given assistance getting a job at London Weekend Television (LWT) by fellow ex-Newcastle journalist Nicholas Evans, who was at the time working on Weekend World. Dyke got a junior position on LWT's local politics programme, in the current affairs department. His bosses there were John Birt and Peter Jay. He attracted attention for trying to give the programmes he worked on a more populist edge. This led to him being given the chance to launch a new early evening current affairs topical news programme. This became The Six O'Clock Show, fronted by Michael Aspel, with co-hosts Danny Baker and Janet Street-Porter. The show is seen by many as the first example of British tabloid TV.

After the success of The Six O' Clock Show, Dyke was brought in by Jonathan Aitken to become programme director at ailing station TV-am in April 1983. The station was doing very badly in the ratings compared to the BBC's popular Breakfast Time magazine style programme. He was instrumental in reviving the breakfast show's fortunes by introducing a new schedule based around popular features including bingo, celebrity gossip and horoscopes.

Dyke left TV-am, in May 1984 after Bruce Gyngell was brought in to enhance and improve the company to allow it to be financially viable. Ten days later, Michael Moor, the TV-am general manager, also left the station. In August 1984, Dyke became director of programmes at Television South (TVS).

In April 1987, Dyke moved from TVS to LWT again to be director of programmes, replacing John Birt, having originally worked at LWT in 1978. At the same time, he helped LWT re-sectioning the company in a bid to cut costs and overhaul the working practices within the company ahead of a new franchise period, which it won. Dyke was responsible for cancelling ITV's coverage of professional wrestling in 1988. In 1992 he was appointed the chairman of the ITV Council, and LWT chief executive. In February 1993 he was appointed chairman of the GMTV board and tasked with overhauling the station format, which included "more popular journalism". His role was primarily to bring new and imaginative ideas to the station without taking on full day-to-day running. In 1994, he made a fortune when Granada bought out LWT.

=== Pearson and Channel 5 ===
Dyke became chairman and chief executive of Pearson Television in January 1995, and began expanding the company. His first acquisition was Grundy Television which helped build Pearson into the biggest non-US independent production company in the world.

At the end of October 1995 a consortium guided by Dyke was awarded the licence for Channel 5, and he became the first chairman of the new channel. He was appointed chairman of Channel 5 on 21 February 1997. Also in 1997 he was asked to review the Patients' Charter of the National Health Service.

=== At the BBC ===
In 2000, Dyke took over from John Birt as director-general of the BBC. He was appointed despite Conservative protests that he had donated £50,000 to the Labour Party and was a 'crony'. At the beginning of his tenure, he famously promised to "cut the crap" at the corporation. The "crap" he referred to was the complex internal market Birt had introduced at the BBC which, it was argued, turned employees away from making programmes and into managers. Dyke reversed this trend – he reduced administration costs from 24% of total income to 15%. Unusually for a recent director-general, he had a good rapport with his employees and was popular with the majority of BBC staff, his management style being seen as more open and risk-taking than Birt's.

Jonathan Gifford, who worked for BBC Magazines in BBC Worldwide during the management of Birt and Dyke, observed "Dyke came across well. He was direct, sensible and approachable. His vision for the BBC was inspirational." Martin Montague, a producer on digital radio station BBC7 said "I know that people in local radio think he walks on water because of all that he's put into that."

Apart from restoring staff morale, Dyke laid claim to two major achievements during his office. In 2002, he introduced the Freeview terrestrial digital transmission platform with six additional BBC channels, and persuaded Sky TV to join the consortium. Previously this was an ITV subscription service that had closed with major losses, but by mid-2007 it could be seen by more than half the population. After leaving the BBC, he said that he always realised that the introduction of Freeview helped to prevent a subscription funding model for the BBC gain traction, because it is impossible for broadcasters to switch off the signal to individual Freeview boxes.

Dyke controversially described the corporation in early 2001 as "hideously white", based on statistics that showed the organisation's management structure was 98% white. Dyke said that "The figures we have at the moment suggest that quite a lot of people from different ethnic backgrounds that we do attract to the BBC leave. Maybe they don't feel at home, maybe they don't feel welcome." Dyke set a target that by 2003, 10% of the BBC's UK workforce and 4% of management would be from ethnic minority backgrounds. In September 2004, Dyke received an award for his remarks from Glasgow-based organisation Empower Scotland, which fights against workplace racism.

Dyke attracted criticism when he "forgot" to sell an equity stake in Granada Television, which presented a conflict of interest in his new position. He also caused controversy when he lost the rights to Premier League football to ITV, then accused the league of fixing the auction. Others were worried that the openness and high risk strategies of his management style could backfire on the corporation. An ITV executive was quoted as saying, "By being too radical and playing fast and loose with the public service remit, the BBC is inviting external regulation – and it deserves it."

In 2009, Dyke said the BBC was part of a "Westminster conspiracy" preventing the "radical changes" needed to UK democracy and that the separation between the "political class", including the BBC, and the public had never been greater. He said he had tried to raise the problem during his time in charge of the BBC but discussion had been blocked by a combination of the "politicos on the board of governors" of the BBC, the Labour cabinet and the political journalists at the BBC. He believed that these groups resist change as it is not in their interests.

=== Hutton Report and firing by the BBC ===
Dyke resigned from the BBC on 29 January 2004 along with Gavyn Davies and Andrew Gilligan, after the publication of the Hutton Report into the circumstances surrounding the death of David Kelly. Hutton described Dyke's approach to checking news stories as "defective"; when Alastair Campbell complained about the story, Dyke had immediately defended it without investigating whether there was any merit to the complaint.

In an email sent to all BBC staff just prior to his departure Dyke wrote:

I accept that the BBC made errors of judgement and I've sadly come to the conclusion that it will be hard to draw a line under this whole affair while I am still here. We need closure. We need closure to protect the future of the BBC, not for you or me but for the benefit of everyone out there. It might sound pompous but I believe the BBC really matters.

It was subsequently established that Dyke had offered his resignation to the BBC's Board of Governors while hoping that they would reject it. However, he was only able to secure the support of about one-third of the governors. Dyke withdrew his resignation offer and was then sacked by the board.

Some BBC staff felt that too much blame had been placed on their organisation in the wake of the David Kelly affair in the Hutton Report, and that the government was interfering in the BBC. Tim Gospill, spokesman for the National Union of Journalists said "Being independent doesn't just mean not having the government telling you what to do. It means you can criticise the government as well. I'm not at all sure the government understands that." Groups of staff staged walk outs from Broadcasting House and other BBC offices in Birmingham, Manchester, Newcastle, Glasgow, Cardiff and Derry, in protest at Dyke's resignation. In addition, on 31 January 2004, BBC staff paid for a full-page advert in The Daily Telegraph to express their "dismay" over Dyke's departure. The fundraisers hoped to raise £10,000, a lot less than the market rate for a full-page advert in a broadsheet newspaper. Reportedly they raised less than this amount, but were offered a deal by the Telegraph's advertising department which allowed the advert to be printed. It was signed by around 4,000 BBC employees; 10,000 (around a third of total BBC staff at the time) submitted their names for publication, but there was not sufficient space to include them all.

The statement in the advertisement read:

Greg Dyke stood for brave, independent and rigorous BBC journalism that was fearless in its search for the truth. We are resolute that the BBC should not step back from its determination to investigate the facts in pursuit of the truth.

Through his passion and integrity Greg inspired us to make programmes of the highest quality and creativity.

We are dismayed by Greg's departure, but we are determined to maintain his achievements and his vision for an independent organisation that serves the public above all else.

Speaking on GMTV on 30 January, Dyke himself questioned the conclusions of the report, saying "We were shocked it was so black and white [...] We knew mistakes had been made but we didn't believe they were only by us." He also said Lord Hutton was "quite clearly wrong" on certain aspects of law relating to the case.

On 11 January 2007, the BBC published minutes of its post-Hutton board meetings. It was revealed that Dyke had said he had been "mistreated and want[ed] to be reinstated".

=== After the Hutton Inquiry ===
On 28 November 2003, Dyke was formally appointed by the University of York as its new chancellor, replacing Dame Janet Baker, who had served in the post since November 1991. There was some controversy regarding his appointment in the midst of the Iraq Dossier scandal. He officially took the post in August 2004. In this role, he is the honorary and ceremonial head of the university, as well as heading the University Development Board. He has also made a personal grant to the new Department of Theatre, Film and Television, to found the Greg Dyke Chair in Film and Television. On 6 February 2004, Dyke announced that he had signed a six-figure book contract with HarperCollins. The book, Inside Story, subsequently published in September 2004, goes into detail about Dyke's opinion on the relationship between the BBC and the British government, and of the Dr. David Kelly affair and Hutton Inquiry. In July 2004, Dyke was awarded honorary doctorates from the University of Sunderland, Middlesex University and in 2006 from The University of Bedfordshire. He was appointed chair of the British Film Institute on 15 February 2008, succeeding Anthony Minghella. On 10 March 2010, it was reported that he had been approached by Alexander Lebedev and his son Evgeny Lebedev to edit The Independent and The Independent on Sunday newspapers.

In the wake of the News of the World hacking affair, Dyke frequently appeared in the media to comment on events. In April 2011, he said "I don't think the News of the World is a great contribution to British journalism. [...] They had obviously being [sic] playing fast and loose for a long time and are now getting their just deserts."

=== Football administration ===
Performance of Brentford F.C. over time. Under Dyke's chairmanship Brentford F.C. experienced their worst performance since the 1970s.

Dyke has been a director of both Manchester United and Brentford football clubs, and was chairman of the FA from 2013 to 2016. He has said that he supported both clubs since he was a child, although his older brothers supported Tottenham. He became a fan of Brentford when his brother played for the club as a junior. Manager Bill Dodgin Sr. tried to sign his brother, but their father would not agree to him committing to what he saw as a badly paid and insecure career.

From 1997 to 1999, Dyke served as a non-executive director of Manchester United, and was the sole board member to oppose a takeover bid from BSkyB, which was subsequently rejected by the Monopolies and Mergers Commission. When he became director-general of the BBC he admitted a "potential conflict of interest" between his new post and his non-executive directorship at Manchester United plc. He resigned his position to avoid controversy. In a speech at the Manchester Evening News Business of the Year Awards, he said "it was seen as a conflict of interest to both buy and sell football rights. My kids have never forgiven me for joining the BBC because of that."

Dyke was the non-executive chairman of Brentford from 20 January 2006 until July 2013. He was appointed as part of the club takeover by Bees United, the Brentford Supporters Trust.

At Brentford, Dyke's focus was on budget constraints for the small club and the necessity to generate money from televised matches and other means. Under Dyke the club's performance was initially unsteady, with a few highlights but the club experiencing its worst run since the 1970s. On 28 January 2006, they beat Premier League strugglers Sunderland 2–1 in the fourth round of the FA Cup, but lost 3–1 to another Premier League club Charlton Athletic (of which former BBC chairman Michael Grade was non-executive director) in the fifth round.

The club finished third in the league that year and lost to Swansea City in the play-off semi-final. These initial slight successes preceded a spell of misfortune which saw Brentford lose 16 matches in a row and be relegated to Football League Two in 2007. Turnover of managers was fast, with Allen, Leroy Rosenior, Scott Fitzgerald, Alan Reeves, Barry Quin and Terry Butcher in the space of two years, before Butcher's assistant Andy Scott got the team back on track, winning the League Two title on 25 April 2009. Scott could not continue the success and after a series of poor results he was sacked in February 2011. Dyke remained upbeat:

"We are slightly disappointed with this season, as we increased the playing budget. The highlight was getting to Wembley but we froze a little in the final. But we have a good team, no matter who the manager is. We are spending enough money and we should be getting to the play-offs."

Dyke announced plans in 2010 for the club to move to a new ground, selling off the Griffin Park ground for residential housing to raise money. Dyke said: "Our aim is to move into a new stadium in Lionel Road and to move there as a club free of debt."

Dyke replaced David Bernstein as chairman of The Football Association in July 2013 after relinquishing his role as Brentford chairman and receiving approval from the FA council. In September, Dyke warned of an "alarming" lack of homegrown talent in English football, with fewer and fewer homegrown players in the top flight, and set England the target of at least reaching the semi-finals of UEFA Euro 2020 and then winning the 2022 FIFA World Cup.

After Sepp Blatter's sudden departure from FIFA on 2 June 2015, when Blatter said he was resigning for honorable reasons and to allow FIFA to move on, Dyke said: "I don't believe a word of this. If he believes that, why not step down last week when we asked him to? He was cock-a-hoop when he won the election and terribly arrogant. Clearly there is a smoking gun. This is nothing to do with Mr Blatter being honorable; he hasn't been honorable for years".

Dyke left the FA in 2016, deciding not to stand for re-election, as he struggled to reform the organisation. He was succeeded as chairman by Greg Clarke.

=== Comments on News of the World phone hacking scandal ===
Dyke appeared on BBC Two's Newsnight programme on 8 July 2011 alongside comedian Steve Coogan, where he confronted former News of the World deputy features editor Paul McMullen over his attitude to the events of the phone hacking scandal. Dyke told McMullen "You're [the tabloids] nothing to do with a free press, or a decent democracy". Distancing himself from McMullen he said "I've spent most of my life being a journalist, and I'm nothing to do with him, and neither are most other journalists." He continued "You could see there are occasionally, very occasionally, public interest cases but most of the time [it wouldn't make it less morally reprehensible]. These guys [tabloid journalists] just tapped anyone they could think of". He was also of the opinion that stronger independent regulation of the press was needed, saying that broadcast media had always been more strictly regulated.

On 11 July 2011, Dyke wrote in the Financial Times that "from the moment it was revealed that the News of the World had hacked into Milly Dowler's phone, Rupert Murdoch's bid to buy the 60.9% of British Sky Broadcasting that News Corp does not already own was all but over". He said, "for those of us who have been warning about the tactics used by the Murdoch operation for many years – Mr Murdoch once described me as 'an enemy' – the events of the past week have been sweet."

== Political views ==
In his early years, Dyke was an active supporter of the Labour Party. In 1977, he attempted to win a seat on the Greater London Council (GLC) for Labour at Putney. Until 1999, he was considered "very much part of Tony Blair's New England", attending parties to celebrate Labour's 1997 election victory. He donated £55,000 to the party, which prompted controversy over his subsequent appointment as BBC director-general during the Blair government. He was also asked to write a report on the future of the NHS.

On 2 May 2005, prior to the general election, Dyke went public at a Liberal Democrats press conference and said that "democracy was under threat if Labour was elected for a third term".

On 20 April 2009, it was announced that Dyke was to lead a review of the UK's creative sector for the Conservative Party.

== Personal life ==
Dyke has been married twice. He met his first wife Christine Taylor at the University of York; they were married for most of the 1970s. He lives in Hampshire, near Stockbridge, with his second wife, Susan Howes, a former sociology teacher and probation officer. Susan is now a trustee of Safe Ground, a charity which works with young offenders. They have four children. The Dykes also own a house on the west coast of County Cork, Ireland.

== Honours ==
=== Scholastic ===
University degrees

Location	Date	School	Degree
England	1974	University of York	Bachelor of Arts (BA) in Politics

Chancellor, visitor, governor, rector and fellowships

Location	Date	School	Position
England	2004 – 2015	University of York	Chancellor
England	April 2018 – Present	London Film School	Chairman

=== Honorary degrees ===
Honorary degrees

Location	Date	School	Degree	Gave Commencement Address
England	1999	University of York	Doctor of the University (D.Univ)	
England	July 2004	University of Sunderland	Doctor of Arts (D.Arts)	
England	2005	Staffordshire University	Doctor of the University (D.Univ)	
England	2006	University of Bedfordshire	Doctor of Arts (D.Arts)	
England	2007	Southampton Solent University	Doctor of Arts (D.Arts)	
England	2013	University of Westminster	Doctorate	
England	2015	London Metropolitan University	Doctor of Philosophy (PhD)	

=== Memberships and fellowships ===
Location	Date	Organisation	Position
United Kingdom	1998–present	Royal Television Society	Fellow
United Kingdom	2016–present	British Film Institute	Fellow

Media offices
Preceded by John Birt	Director-General of the BBC; 2000–2004	Succeeded by Mark Byford (Acting)
Preceded by Anthony Minghella	Chairman of the British Film Institute; 2008–2016	Succeeded by Josh Berger
Preceded by Sophie Turner Laing	Vice President for Television of BAFTA; 2016–2021	Succeeded by Dame Pippa Harris
Sporting positions
Preceded by David Bernstein	Chairman of the Football Association; 2013–2016	Succeeded by Greg Clarke
Academic offices
Preceded by Dame Janet Baker	Chancellor of the University of York; 2004–2015	Succeeded by Sir Malcolm Grant
Preceded by Mike Leigh	Chairman of the London Film School; 2018–present	Incumbent
