= Josh Berger =

American-British entertainment executive (born 1966)

Josh Berger CBE
- Born: Joshua Adam Berger; 1966 (age 59–60); Los Angeles, California
- Education: Harvard College
- Occupation: businessman
- Relatives: Berry Gordy (godfather)

Joshua Adam Berger, CBE (born 1966), is an American-born British business executive and producer in the media and entertainment industry. He is the founder and Chairman of Battersea Entertainment. Berger is also Chair of trustees at The BRIT School.

Previously, Berger was a senior executive at Warner Bros. Entertainment for over three decades, where he served as President & Managing Director of Warner Bros. UK, Ireland, and Spain; and President of Harry Potter Global Franchise Development. He was also Chairman of the British Film Institute, Chairman Emeritus of Chickenshed Theatre Company, and is currently a board member of the Royal Academy of Dramatic Art.

He is a producer of the Broadway musical Ain't Too Proud: The Life and Times of The Temptations, and executive producer on Fantastic Beasts: The Secrets of Dumbledore.

Berger was appointed a Commander of the Most Excellent Order of the British Empire (CBE) in the Queen's 2012 Birthday Honours List for outstanding services to the UK's creative industries.

== Early life and education ==
Berger was born in Los Angeles, California, to artist manager Shelly Berger and talent agent Elinor Berger. His godfather is American music impresario Berry Gordy.

About his childhood, Berger has said:

“I learned a ton about creativity – by osmosis really – from hanging around the incredible artists my father and godfather worked with, people like Diana Ross, The Temptations, Smokey Robinson, The Jackson 5, and Marvin Gaye, among others."

He attended Beverly Hills High School between 1980 and 1984. During that time, he directed, produced, and hosted television programmes aired over Group W’s cable network. He also produced a stage production of Oklahoma!, which starred fellow students Jon Turteltaub and Nicolas Cage, under the supervision of John Ingle, who was the head of the school's drama department at the time.

In the summer of 1983, he worked in the mailroom at Hollywood talent agency The William Morris Agency.

Berger enrolled at Harvard College in 1984. In 1986, he spent a gap year working at production and distribution company Lorimar-Telepictures (bought by Warner Bros. in 1989) in Los Angeles and New York, and at Silvio Berlusconi’s Rete Italia in Milan. While in Milan, he also worked for ad agency Bozell, Jacobs, Kenyon & Eckhardt, where he recorded the voiceover for the launch of Sanpellegrino’s One O One.

While at Harvard, Berger was the publicity director for the university's theatre organisation, Hasty Pudding Theatricals, the oldest theatral organisation in the US.

== Career ==
After graduating from Harvard, Berger joined Warner Bros. in 1989 as a sales executive in the TV distribution division. He then worked in a number of leadership roles in Paris, Madrid, and London, where he settled in 1996.

In London, Berger oversaw all of Warner Bros.’ TV activities, including equity investments and co-productions, for the Europe, Middle East, and Africa regions. During this time, he sat on the boards of CanalSatellite in France, Spain, and the Nordics, and was a founding director of e.tv in South Africa.

In 2002, Berger became Warner Bros.’ first Country Manager, for the UK and Ireland, setting the template for a management model which integrates the disparate divisions in a territory under one leader and one corporate structure. In the role, he was responsible for all Warner Bros.’ business activities in the region, including film distribution, Television distribution, home entertainment, video-games and consumer products, among others.

During his tenure, Berger was instrumental in the expansion of the company's activities in the UK, in particular in the acquisition of Leavesden Studios, and the development of Warner Bros. Studio Tour London – The Making of Harry Potter. He oversaw over 350 theatrical releases in the UK and Ireland, including The Hangover, the Harry Potter series, Argo, The Dark Knight trilogy, Gravity, The Lego Movie, Dunkirk, It, and Joker.

Berger was also part of the effort to expand into the UK video-games sector. He worked closely with the two leading games developers and publishers Traveller's Tales (on whose board he served) and Rocksteady that Warner Bros. acquired, resulting in major successes such as Batman: Arkham Asylum, Batman: Arkham City, Lego Star Wars, Lego Batman and Lego Harry Potter.

In 2008, Berger was a member of the National Finance Committee for the Obama-Biden election campaign. Berger subsequently fulfilled the same role for the 2012 campaign.

In 2009, Berger added management of Spain to his responsibilities, and in this capacity he oversaw the transformation of the team into a hub for world-class Spanish-language productions, including such successful theatrical releases as Lo Imposible, Palmeras en la Nieve, and Villaviciosa de al lado.

In 2013, Berger established the award-winning Warner Bros. Creative Talent programme to develop emerging talent from all backgrounds in the UK and Ireland, identifying a pipeline for the UK and Ireland's creative industries in film, TV, games and theatre.

In 2014, Berger took responsibility for the expansion of the Harry Potter global franchise effort, leading Warner Bros.’ expanded creative partnership with J.K. Rowling. In the role, Berger worked on numerous initiatives including the Fantastic Beasts film series; The Wizarding World of Harry Potter attractions at Universal Studios in Florida, Hollywood, Japan, and Beijing; videogame label Portkey Games; the stage-play Harry Potter and the Cursed Child; and the Harry Potter Fan Club.

In October 2020, Berger announced his departure from Warner Bros. after 31 years at the company.

== Producing ==
Berger is a producer of the Tony award-winning Broadway and West End musical Ain't Too Proud: The Life and Times of The Temptations.

He was also an executive producer of the third instalment of the Fantastic Beasts film series, The Secrets of Dumbledore, and the BBC documentary Fantastic Beasts: A Natural History.

In 2022, Berger produced Guy Ritchie's The Covenant, starring Jake Gyllenhaal.

== Personal life ==
Berger has been a British citizen since July 2011, and is based in Battersea, London. He has two children.

== Boards and memberships ==
Berger currently serves as the non-executive Chairman of The BRIT School. The school has trained over 10,000 young people in music, theatre, dance, media production, and visual arts. The school's alumni include Adele, Loyle Carner, Tom Holland, Amy Winehouse, Cush Jumbo, and many other notable artists, and creative professionals working at leading companies including Apple, the BBC, Facebook, Sky, and TikTok, among many others.

Previously, Berger served as Chairman of the British Film Institute from 2016 to 2020, having been a BFI Governor since 2011. In this role, Berger promoted the cultural and economic value of the creative industries, and championed the push for greater diversity in the screen industries, including the development and promotion of the BFI Diversity Standards.

He is also chairman emeritus of Chickenshed Theatre Trust; a former board member of the Royal Academy of Dramatic Art (RADA); a Member of the British Academy of Film and Television Arts (BAFTA) and the British Screen Forum; a Director of the International Academy of Television Arts & Sciences; and a life member of the Council on Foreign Relations.

Berger also formerly sat on the Board of Directors of Secret Cinema, which creates immersive theatre-like live experiences based on leading IP.

== Honours ==
In 2012, Berger was appointed a Commander of the Most Excellent Order of the British Empire (CBE) for his outstanding services to the UK's creative industries.

In 2022, Berger was awarded an honorary doctorate from the University of York's School of Arts and Creative Technologies and also appointed as an Honorary Professor of the School.
