= Warner Bros. Studio Tour London – The Making of Harry Potter =

Studio Tour

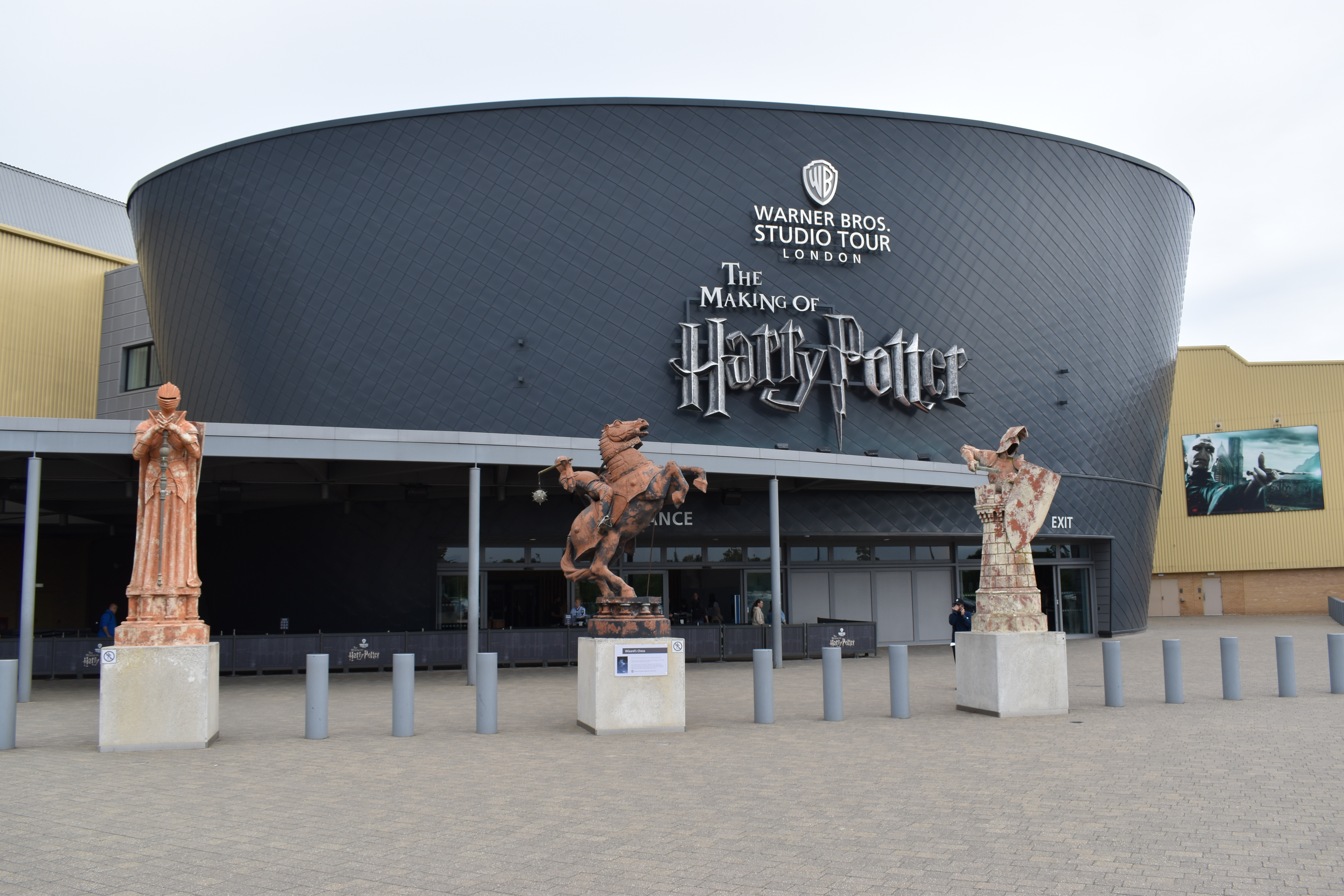
- Entrance to the studio tour, pictured in 2025

Warner Bros. Studios Leavesden
- Area: Soundstages J and K
- Coordinates: 51°41′25″N 0°25′05″W
- Status: Operating
- Opening date: Public opening 31 March 2012; Royal opening 26 April 2013

Ride statistics
- Attraction type: Walk-through exhibition and studio tour
- Designer: Thinkwell Group
- Model: Film studio soundstage
- Theme: Harry Potter film series
- Music: Compositions for the Harry Potter films
- Site area: 14,000 m^{2} (150,000 sq ft)
- Duration: ~3 hours and 30 minutes (self-guided)
- Operator: Warner Bros. Studio Tours
- Owner: Skydance Corporation (Warner Bros. Entertainment)
- Wheelchair accessible
- Assistive listening available
- Closed captioning available

Warner Bros. Studio Tour London – The Making of Harry Potter is a walk-through exhibition and studio tour in Leavesden, Hertfordshire, England, owned by Warner Bros. and operated by their Studio Tours division. It is located within Warner Bros. Studios Leavesden, which is located in Watford, southwest Hertfordshire, and houses a permanent exhibition of authentic costumes, props, and sets utilised in the production of the Harry Potter films, as well as behind-the-scenes production of visual effects. The tour is contained in Soundstages J and K, which were specially built for the attraction, and are separate from the studio's actual production facilities.

Warner Bros. Studio Tour London – The Making of Harry Potter opened to the public in 2012 and has since welcomed over 7,000 visitors a day during peak times.

== History ==
Leavesden Aerodrome was a British airfield created in 1940 by the de Havilland Aircraft Company & the Air Ministry in the tiny village of Leavesden, between Watford and Abbots Langley, in Hertfordshire. It was an important centre for aircraft production during World War II. By the end of the war Leavesden Airfield was, by volume, the largest factory in the world.

After the war, the aerodrome was purchased outright by de Havilland, who themselves had a succession of owners in the following decades but ultimately they and the site were acquired by Rolls-Royce. However, by the early 1990s, Britain's manufacturing industry was in decline and Rolls-Royce had sold their interests in the site. Unable to find a new owner, Leavesden Aerodrome was left disused and all but abandoned.

Then in 1994, the production team for the James Bond film GoldenEye discovered the unoccupied Leavesden. The wide, tall and open aircraft hangars were uniquely well suited to conversion into film stages. Eon leased the site for the duration of their shoot and went about gutting the factories, turning them into stages, workshops and offices - in short a working film studio. Leavesden Studios, as the site was rebranded by its owners, quickly became popular after GoldenEye wrapped. A succession of major feature films made use of the site, including the first of the Star Wars prequels, The Phantom Menace, and Tim Burton's Sleepy Hollow.

In 1999, Heyday Films leased the site for the Harry Potter films. Over the following ten years, all of the Harry Potter films were made there, along with some other notable Warner Bros. productions, with the Harry Potter series eventually becoming the most successful film series in history.

As the eighth and final film, Harry Potter and the Deathly Hallows – Part 2, was nearing completion, in 2010, Warner Bros. announced their intention to purchase the studio as a permanent European base. By November of that year, Warner Bros. completed its purchase of Leavesden Studios and announced plans to invest more than £100 million into the site they had occupied for over ten years, rebranding it again – this time to Warner Bros. Studios Leavesden.

As part of the redevelopment, Warner Bros. also created two new soundstages, J and K, to house a permanent public exhibition called Warner Bros. Studio Tour London – The Making of Harry Potter, creating 300 new jobs in the local area. Currently, the whole attraction is dedicated to the making of Harry Potter and is now home to many of the series' sets, props and costumes. It was opened to the public in early 2012.

== Creation ==
As early as 2001, following the success of the first film, Warner Bros. were putting plans in place to build an attraction dedicated to the series and so began storing items from the films when they were no longer being used. In 2010, as the final film was nearing completion, Warner Bros. announced they would be purchasing Leavesden Studios and work on the tour began.

The tour's layout and overall presentation was designed by the Burbank-based Thinkwell Group in collaboration with Warner Bros, as well as the actual filmmakers, including production designer Stuart Craig, set dresser Stephenie McMillan, creature designer Nick Dudman, construction manager Paul Hayes and special effects supervisor John Richardson. It only includes sets, props and costumes that were created for or used in the production of the Harry Potter film series. Sets include the Great Hall, Dumbledore's office, Diagon Alley, the Ministry of Magic, the Gryffindor common room and boys' dormitory, Hagrid's hut and a 1:24 scale model of the Hogwarts castle (used for exterior shots).

=== Grand opening ===
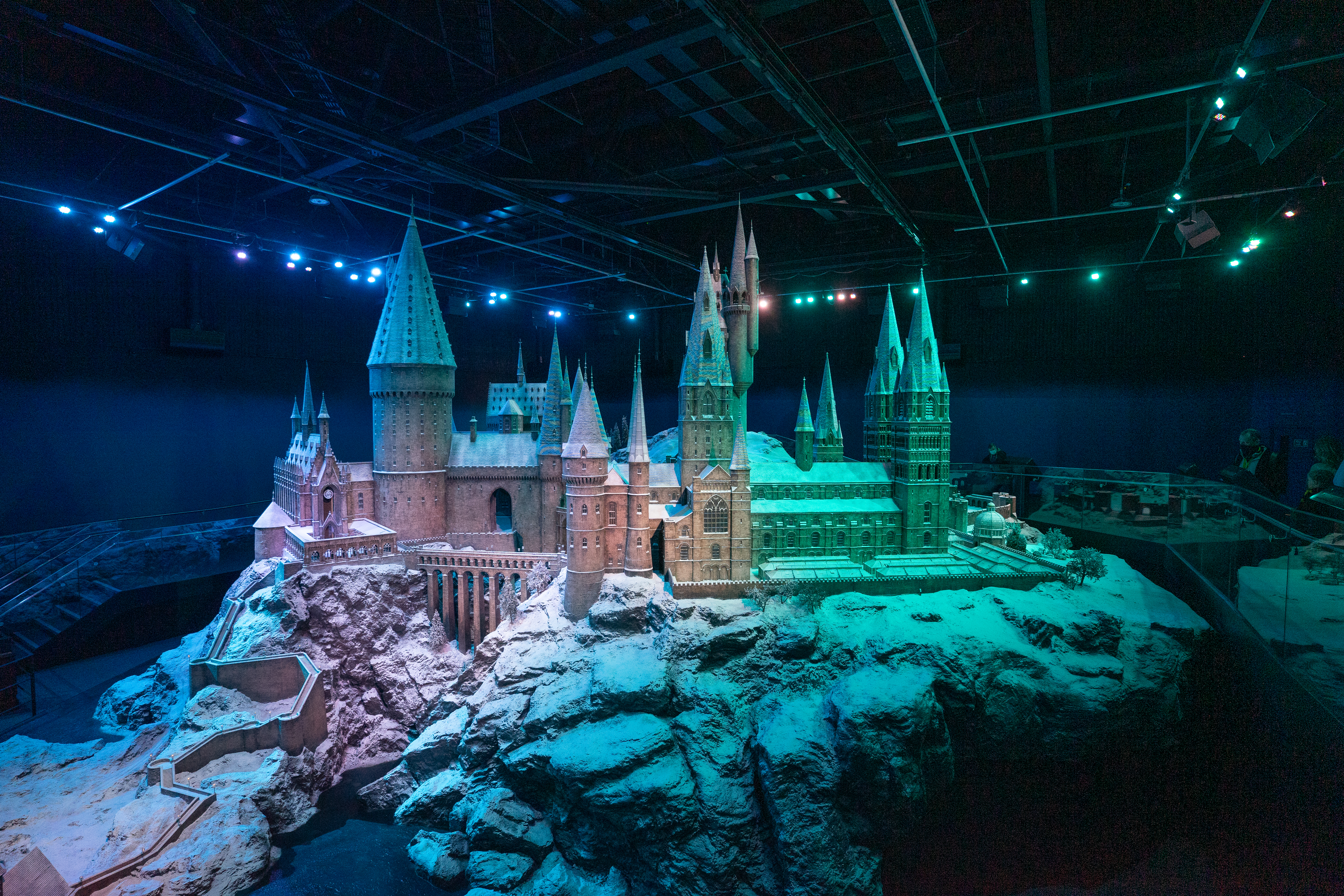
The 1:24 scale model of Hogwarts on display

Warner Bros. Studio Tour London – The Making of Harry Potter opened to the public on 31 March 2012. The opening event was attended by many of the Harry Potter film series' cast and crew members, including Rupert Grint, Tom Felton, Bonnie Wright, Evanna Lynch, Warwick Davis, David Thewlis, Helen McCrory, George Harris, Nick Moran, Natalia Tena, David Bradley, Alfred Enoch, Harry Melling, producers David Heyman and David Barron and directors David Yates, Alfonso Cuarón and Mike Newell. Since 2020, Harry Potter fans have been able to purchase bottled 'Butterbeer' exclusively at the tour.

=== Royal opening ===
Over a year since the opening of the tour (and nearly twenty years after the complex was converted from an aerodrome to film studios), the site was officially opened by Prince William and Catherine on 26 April 2013. On their royal visit, they were accompanied by Prince Harry and J. K. Rowling, author of the Harry Potter book series, who had been unable to attend the tour's grand opening the year before, amongst other guests. Several hundred beneficiaries of charities they all support were given exclusive invitations to the tour on the day of the royal visit. The royal entourage visited the tour and met many of their beneficiaries, as well as the studios, where they saw some of the props and costumes from Christopher Nolan's The Dark Knight trilogy, before conducting Leavesden's royal opening.

== Tour ==
Each tour session typically lasts three and a half hours, and the tour has the capacity to handle 6,000 visitors daily. Despite Warner Bros. being the studio behind Harry Potter, the tour is not styled as a theme park because Warner Bros. sold the licence to do so to Universal Studios. Instead, visitors get a chance to see up close the detail and effort that goes into a major feature film at the scale of the Harry Potter series.

Though the standard tour is self guided, allowing visitors to experience the tour at their own pace, various guided tours are available at an additional cost. Accessible guided tours are offered.

Diagon Alley is available to explore virtually on Google Street View.

A shuttle bus system for tour goers operates between Watford Junction and the Studio Tour.

== Expansions ==
Warner Bros. has continued to put on special features for the school holidays, such as Dark Arts and Animal Actors. Some installations like the Wand Choreography Interactive and the inside of the No. 4 Privet Drive Exterior set have been so popular that they have remained after their respective features have closed.

=== Platform 9¾ ===
In January 2015, the attraction's first expansion was announced – a new Platform 9¾ section, where visitors are able to board the original carriages behind the Hogwarts Express steam engine used in the films. The set was constructed and dressed by the original crew members who worked on the film – including Stuart Craig, who designed the new set exclusively for the tour (since these scenes in the films were actually shot on location in Kings Cross). The setup includes the steam locomotive used in the films (GWR 4900 Hall class no 5972 Olton Hall, wearing Hogwarts Castle nameplates) and the British Rail Mark 1 carriage that appeared in the films, brought to life by John Richardson's special effects team. Finally a green screen experience illustrates what working on the films is like from an actor's point of view. This section opened in late March 2015.

=== Forbidden Forest ===
The attraction's Forbidden Forest expansion opened in March 2017.

=== Gringotts Wizarding Bank ===
In April 2019 the Gringotts Wizarding Bank expansion opened. It is the largest expansion to date, at 16,500 square feet (1,530 m^{2}).

=== Professor Sprout's Greenhouse ===
On 1 July 2022, the Professor Sprout's Greenhouse expansion opened, as part of a new feature titled "Mandrakes and Magical Creatures".

== Reception ==
The tour was warmly received by the press in the run up to its launch. Anita Singh of The Daily Telegraph described the model of Hogwarts Castle as "the highlight" of the tour.

== Awards ==
The Warner Bros. Studio Tour London – The Making of Harry Potter has won several awards since its opening, including:

- 2013 Thea Award for Outstanding Achievement
- 2013 Telly Award for Editing
- 2013 Trip Advisor Certificate of Excellence
- 2013 UKinbound Award for Individual Attraction of the Year
- 2012 Event Technology Silver Award for Best Use of Handheld Technology
- 2012 UK Customer Experience Award for Best Leisure & Retail Experience
- 2012 Group Leisure Award for Best UK Attraction

The tour has also been presented with awards for its lighting design, including the 2013 IES Illumination Award of Merit and 2013 Lighting Design Award for Lighting for Leisure.

In addition, the tour was named one of the 'Top 10 Most Innovative Entertainment Design Projects of 2012' by the website EntertainmentDesigner.com.

== Gallery ==
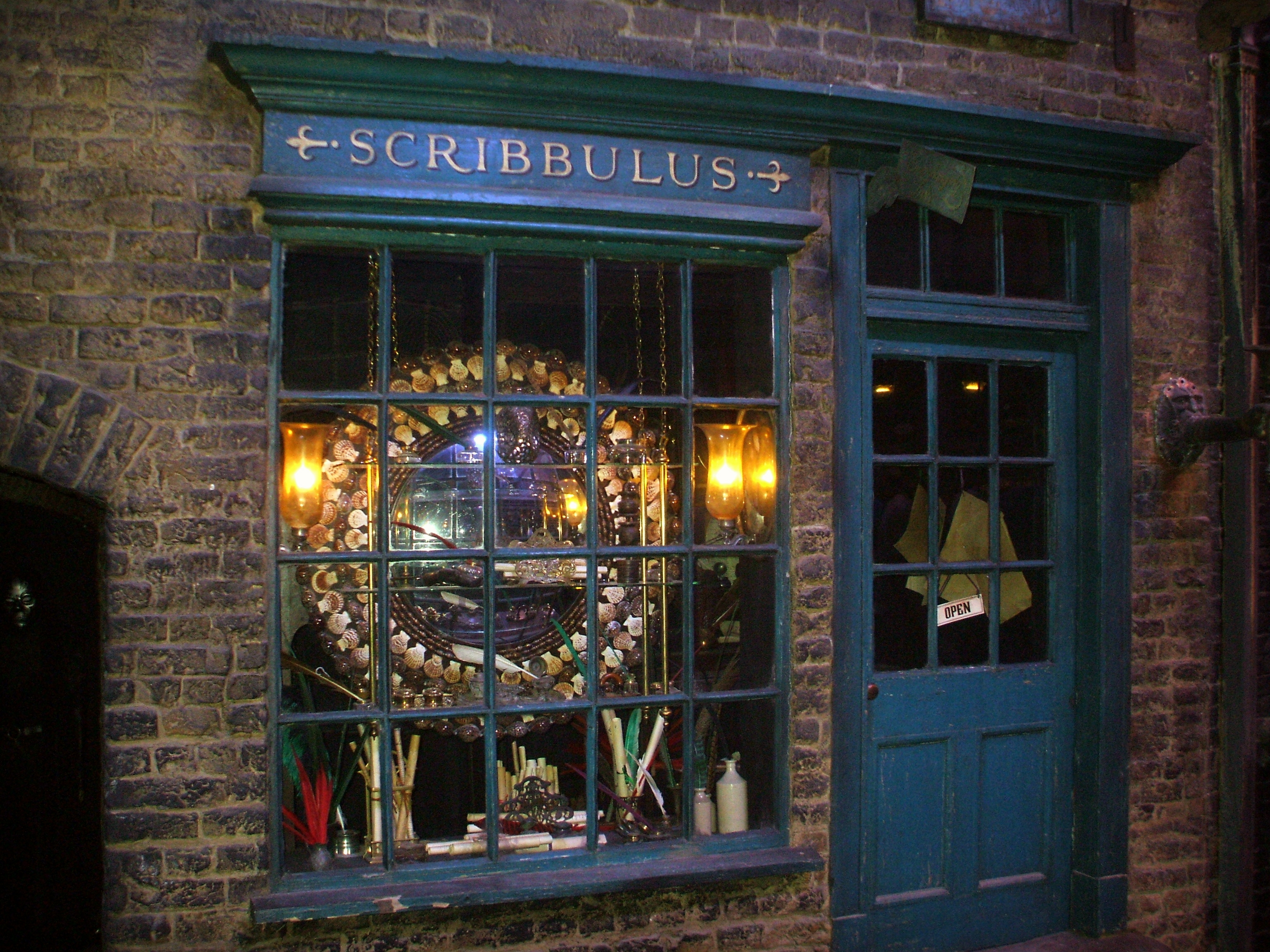
Scribbulus shop, Diagon Alley

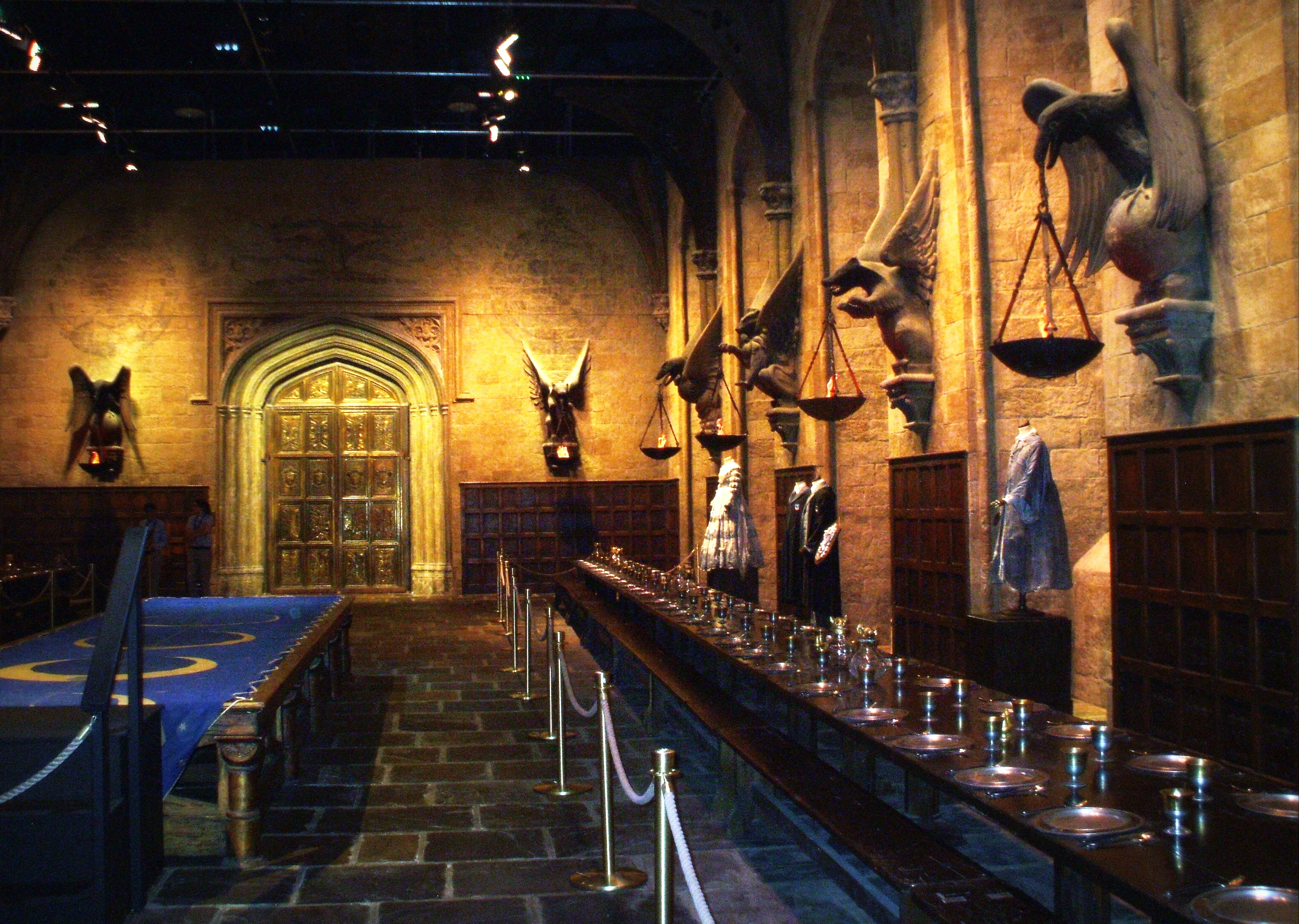
The Great Hall, with a section of the Dueling Club stage set up (left), as seen in Harry Potter and the Chamber of Secrets

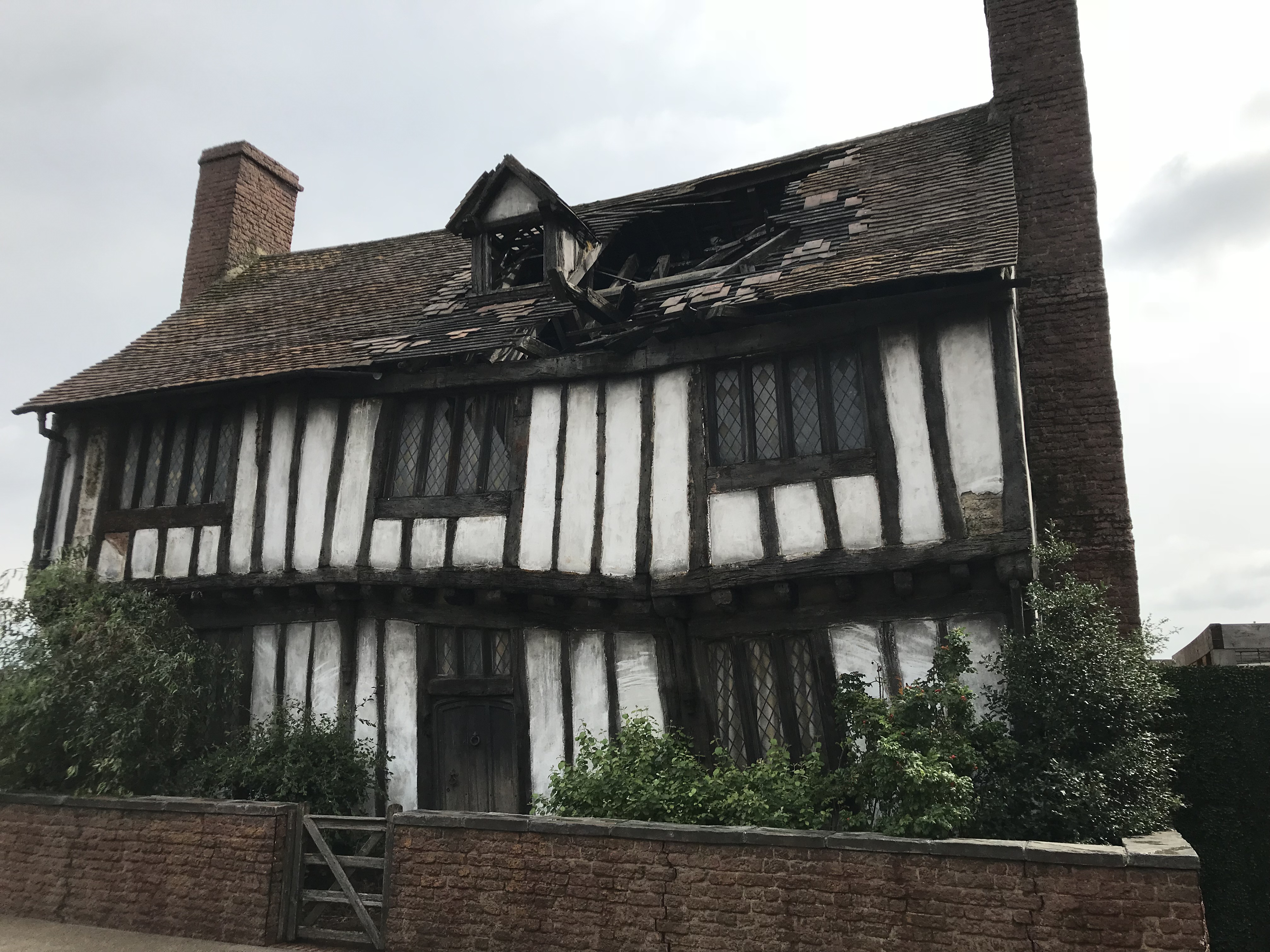
The Potter's residence in Godric's Hollow, as seen in Harry Potter and the Deathly Hallows – Part 1 and Part 2. This set has now been archived with the introduction of the Greenhouse in 2022 and is no longer on display.

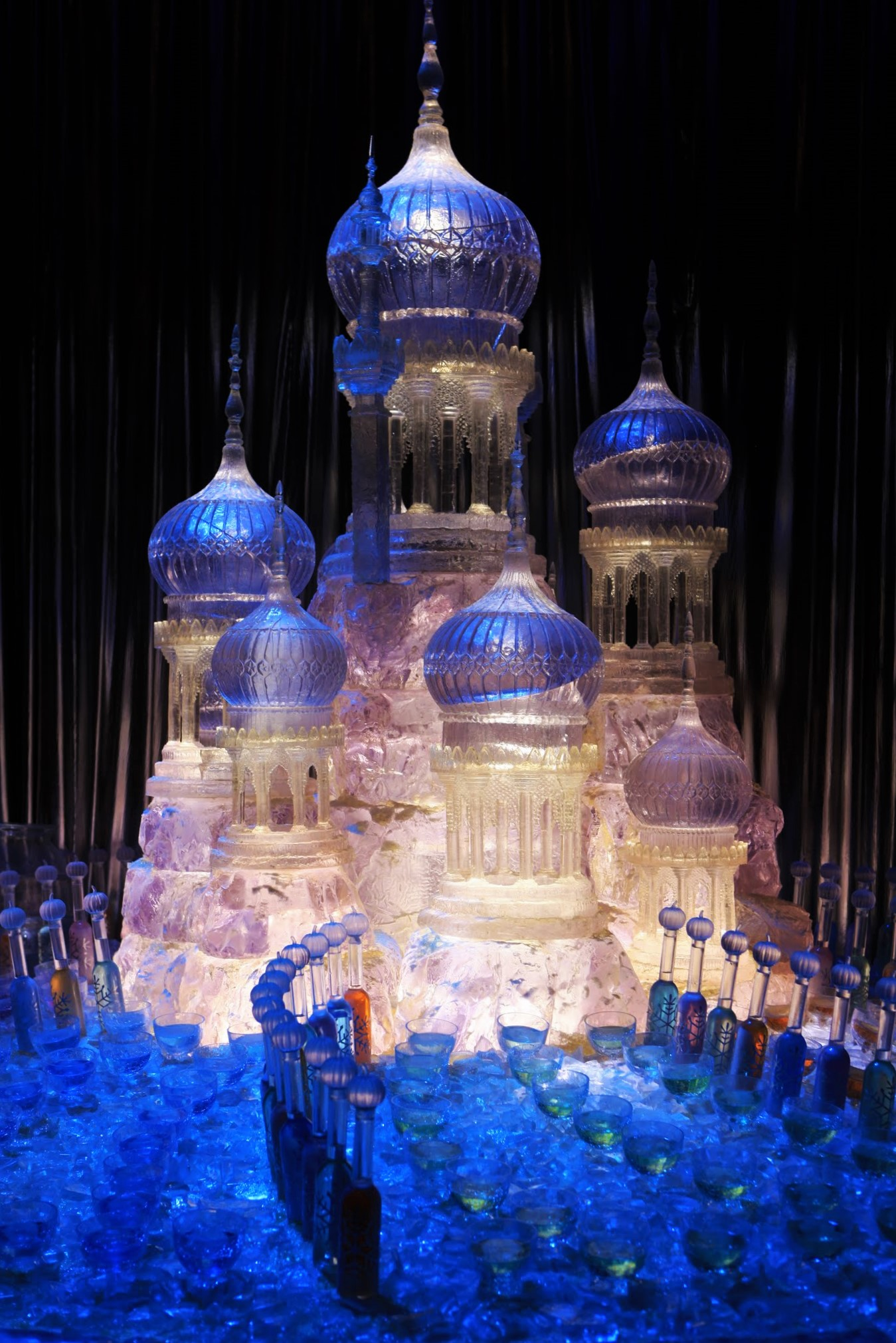
Yule Ball ice sculpture prop, as seen in Harry Potter and the Goblet of Fire

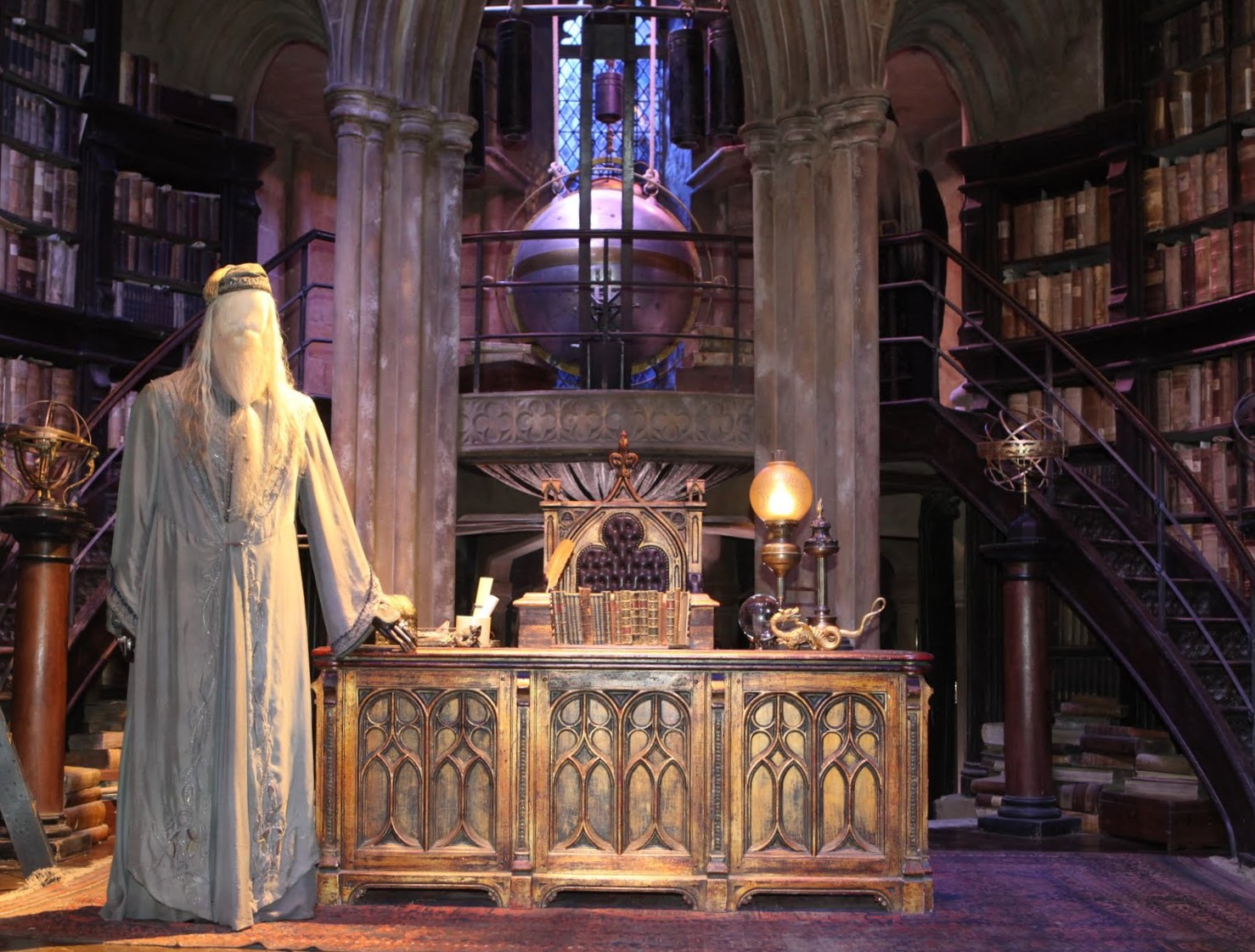
Dumbledore's Office, as seen in the films from Harry Potter and the Chamber of Secrets and forward

== See also ==
- Warner Bros. Studio Tour Hollywood
- Warner Bros. Studio Tour Tokyo – The Making of Harry Potter
- Warner Bros. Studio Tour Shanghai – The Making of Harry Potter
- The Wizarding World of Harry Potter
