= François Bergeron =

American sound designer

- Born: 1964 (age 61–62); Canada

François Bergeron (born 1964) is a Canadian producer, co-founder of Thinkwell Group, and was the former sound designer for Cirque du Soleil for more than twenty years.

== Early life ==
Bergeron was born in Québec, Canada in 1964 and has completed his education from Séminaire de St-Hyacinthe (today Collège Antoine-Girouard). In 1990, he left the Quebec theatre world and joined Cirque du Soleil.

== Career ==
Awarded “Sound Designer of the Year” by Entertainment Design magazine in 1996, Bergeron has been part of multiple award-winning projects with Cirque du Soleil, The Walt Disney Company, Universal Studios, Warner Bros., and Thinkwell Group.

=== Cirque du Soleil ===
Prior to and since the founding of Thinkwell, Bergeron had been working for Cirque du Soleil for 20+ years, serving as Sound Designer for various productions. He continued to assist the company in creating new aural experiences for Cirque's productions around the Globe for years following. His experience across numerous award-winning productions included "O" (Las Vegas), "Zed" (Tokyo), "La Nouba" (Orlando), Varekai (Touring) and many others.

=== Thinkwell Group ===
Bergeron co-founded Thinkwell Group in 2001 and continued to lead the company as chief operations officer and chief financial officer alongside Joe Zenas, chief executive officer, and Craig Hanna, chief creative officer, until Thinkwell Group was sold to TAIT Towers in March 2022.
