= Warner Bros. Studios Leavesden =

Film studio complex in Hertfordshire, England

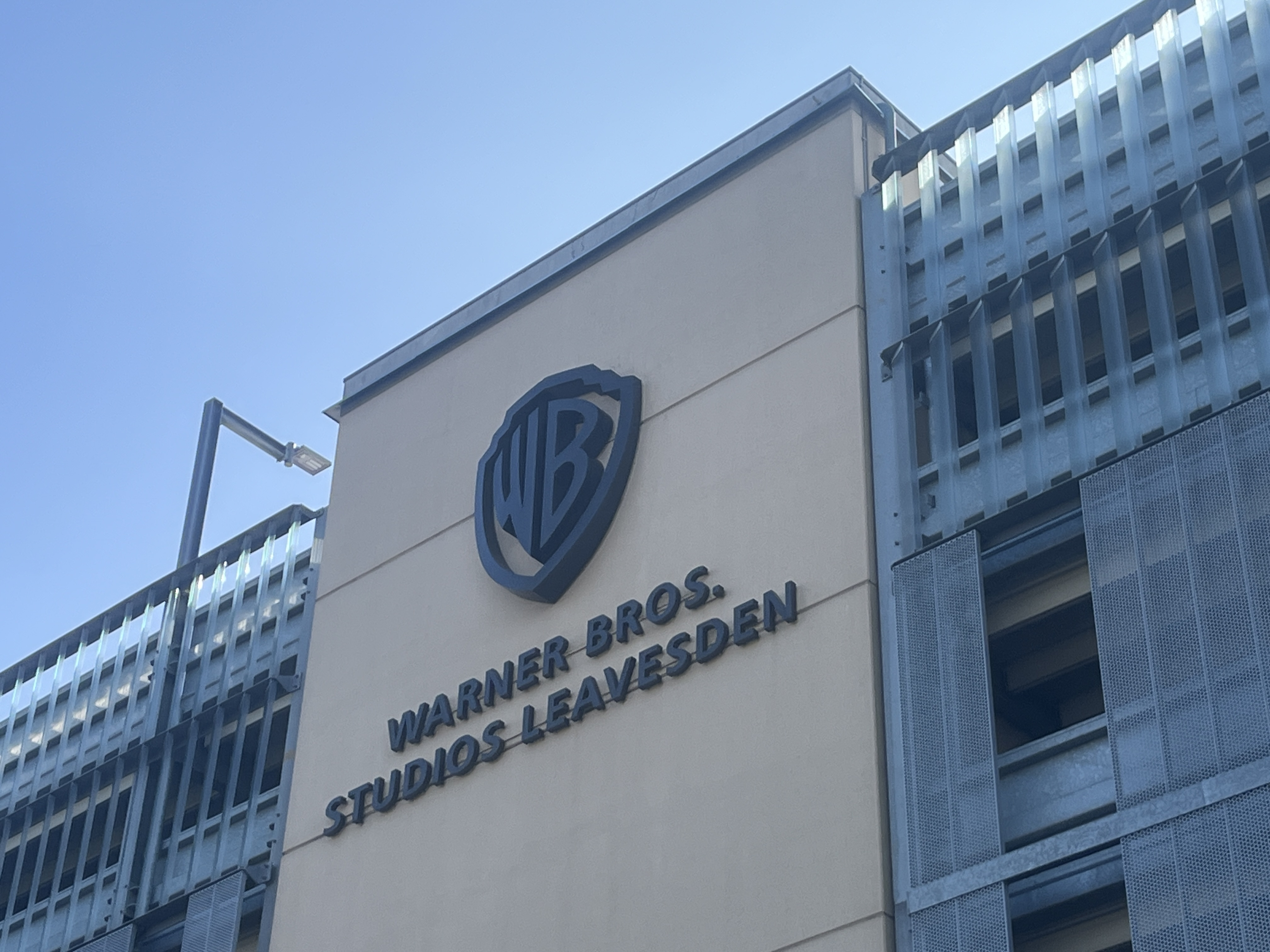
Studio signage on parking area

Warner Bros. Studios Leavesden is an 80 ha (200-acre) studio complex in Leavesden in Watford, Hertfordshire, in the East of England. Formerly known as Leavesden Film Studios and still colloquially known as Leavesden Studios or simply Leavesden, it is a film and media complex owned by Skydance under Warner Bros. Studio Facilities. The studios were all converted from an aircraft factory and airfield called Leavesden Aerodrome, a centre of British aircraft production during World War II. The nearest railway station is King's Langley which is a walking distance of 1.3 miles (2.1 km).

The studios contain approximately 50,000 m^{2} (540,000 sq ft) of flexible space which includes stage space, one of the largest filtered and heated stage-based water tanks in Europe, production office space, workshops and support buildings, along with an extensive 32 ha (79 acres) backlot which offers a 180-degree uninterrupted horizon, favourable for exterior sets. Following a £110 million refurbishment by Warner Bros., the studios are now one of the largest and most state-of-the-art filmmaking facilities in the world. Though the studios are owned by Warner Bros., all of the studio facilities are available to rent for any production. Since acquiring the site, Warner Bros. has opened a public attraction named Warner Bros. Studio Tour London – The Making of Harry Potter, which receives over 6,000 visitors a day at peak times. The site maintains a secure studio space within the same complex.

== History ==
=== Leavesden Aerodrome ===
Leavesden Aerodrome
- IATA: none; ICAO: EGTI

Summary
- Airport type: Airfield and factory, closed
- Owner: de Havilland Aircraft Company (c. 1940–1960); Hawker Siddeley (1960–1977); Rolls-Royce Holdings (1977–closure)
- Location: Leavesden, Abbots Langley, Hertfordshire, England, UK
- In use: 8 December 1941 – 31 March 1994
- Elevation AMSL: 335 ft (102 m)
- Coordinates: 51°41′24″N 0°25′08″W

Map
- Location within Hertfordshire

Leavesden Aerodrome was an airfield created in 1940 by the de Havilland Aircraft Company and the Air Ministry in the village of Leavesden, between Watford and Abbots Langley, in Hertfordshire.

Construction began in 1940 after the outbreak of World War II. The de Havilland company, who were based in nearby Hatfield, entered into a contract with the Air Ministry to produce what would become known as the Mosquito fast bomber aircraft. Space for the large scale hangars needed to produce the huge number of aeroplanes required was not available at de Havilland's Hatfield Aerodrome, so the Ministry of Supply requisitioned this new site in Leavesden, which was an empty plot of land at the time from the Watford Corporation, and it was developed into the complex that it is today. The construction was enormously expensive so parts of the site were leased to the London Aircraft Production Group and The Second Aircraft Group. Under Handley Page, another Hertfordshire-based aeroplane manufacturer contracted to the Air Ministry, these groups produced the Handley Page Halifax heavy bomber. As a result, by the end of the war Leavesden Airfield was, by volume, the largest factory in the world.

The two planes were both critical successes for Britain during the conflict. Due to the high priority placed on aircraft production, large numbers of workers were drafted with little experience or training in aircraft production, with over half the workforce eventually being female. As part of constructing the aircraft factory an airstrip was created, first so the planes could be tested and later to deliver the craft to their final destinations. The runway and control tower still remain to this day, even after two major renovations, in an effort to preserve the site's history. The runway is now the main road through the complex and the tower is currently an observation lounge.

After the war, the aerodrome was purchased outright by de Havilland, who themselves had a succession of owners in the following decades, including Hawker Siddeley from 1959, but ultimately they and the site were acquired by Rolls-Royce who continued production and design of helicopter engines. Under Rolls-Royce ownership the RTM322 engine for the UK Apache, Merlin and NH90 helicopters was designed, developed and produced at Leavesden as a joint venture with Turbomeca of France. The airfield was also used by commercial small business aircraft as the field is close to both the M1 and M25 motorways. However, by the early 1990s, Britain's manufacturing industry was in decline and Rolls-Royce had sold their interests in the site and transferred all work to their Bristol facility. Unable to find a new owner, by 1994 Leavesden Aerodrome was left disused and all but abandoned.

The following units were here at some point:

- No. 122 Gliding School RAF
- Coastal Command Communication Squadron RAF

=== Leavesden Studios ===
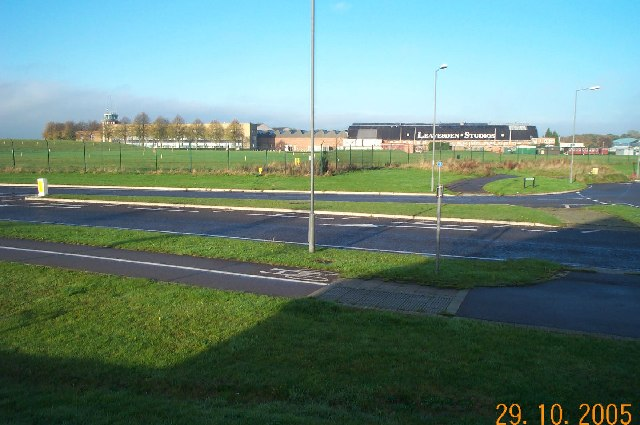
The old "Leavesden Studios" sign in 2005

In 1994, Eon Productions' James Bond film GoldenEye was to be the next film in the series. Pinewood Studios, their traditional home studio, was fully booked with other productions, not being prepared for the series' unexpected return (production had been delayed for several years due to legal issues between MGM and Eon Productions). Facing little time to find a space in which they could build the number of large scale sets required, the production discovered the unoccupied Leavesden. The wide, tall and open aircraft hangars were uniquely well suited to conversion into film stages. Eon leased the site for the duration of their shoot and went about gutting the factories, turning them into the stages, workshops and offices needed for a working film studio. This process is shown on the 2006 DVD's special features. Members of the production crew, impressed by the enormous size of the filmmaking complex they suddenly had to themselves, jokingly called Leavesden "Cubbywood" after Eon's long serving producer Albert R. 'Cubby' Broccoli.

Leavesden Studios, as the site was rebranded by its owners, quickly became popular after filming of GoldenEye was completed. A succession of major feature films made use of the site; in 1997, the first of the Star Wars prequels, The Phantom Menace, and later Tim Burton's Sleepy Hollow.

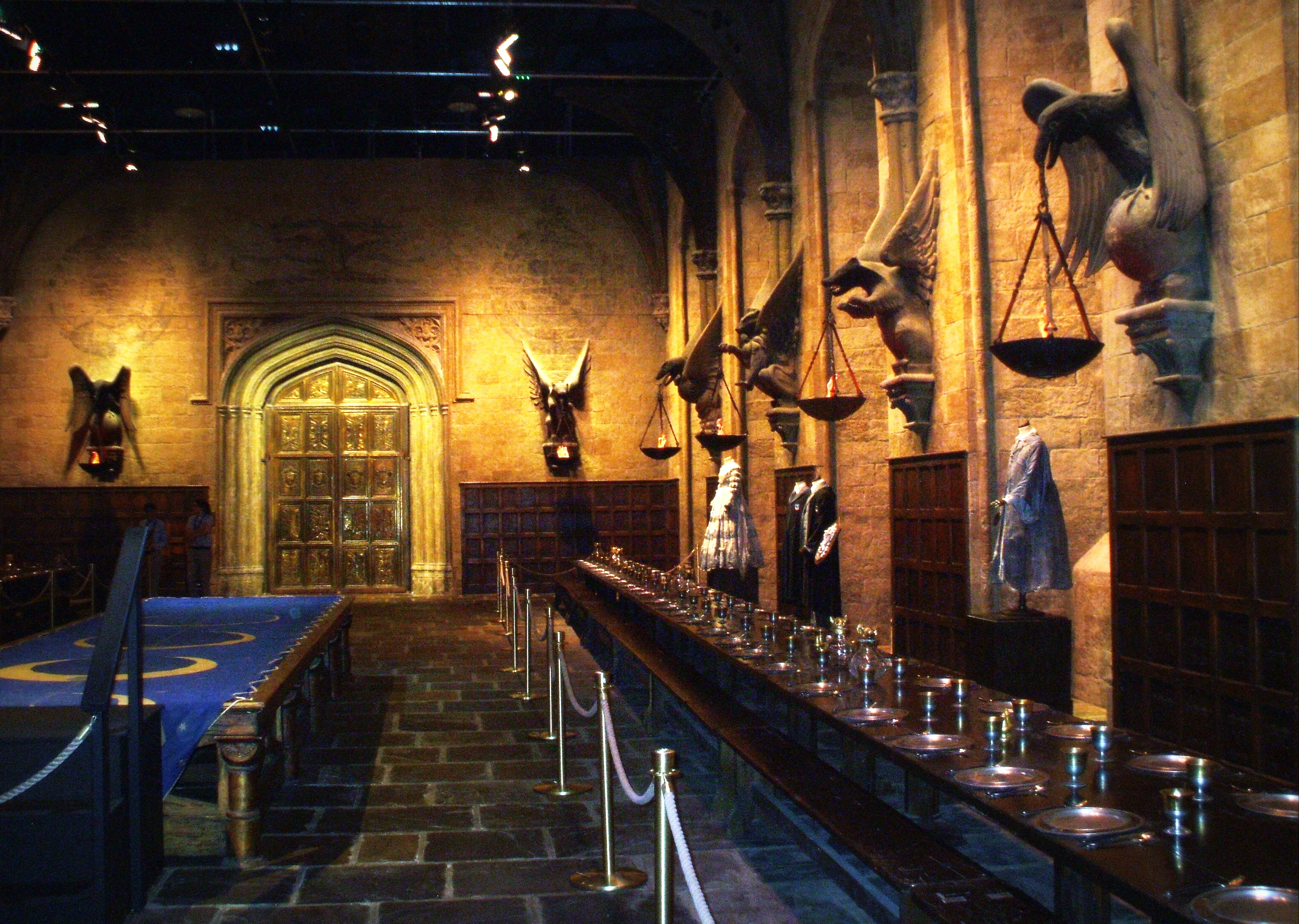
Film set of the Great Hall, Hogwarts at Warner Bros. Studio Tour London, loosely inspired by The Hall of Christ Church, Oxford

By the year 2000, Heyday Films had acquired use of the site on behalf of Warner Bros. for what would be the first in a series of films, Harry Potter and the Philosopher's Stone. Every one of the Harry Potter films was based at Leavesden Studios over the following ten years.

While other productions—almost exclusively other Warner Bros. productions—made partial use of the studios, the site was mostly occupied by Harry Potter's permanent standing sets. Indeed, some films, such as Sweeney Todd: The Demon Barber of Fleet Street and Sherlock Holmes actually made use of some of the Harry Potter sets since they were sufficiently appropriate for their Victorian setting and tone. During this time, however, it was noted that there were some ways in which the site's facilities might be improved. None of the stages were adequately soundproofed and the WW2 era ceilings had a tendency to leak during rainy weather.

One of the more noticeable exterior sets constructed on the Leavesden backlot (outdoors) was a row of ten houses (five per side) along a street, which was created for the Harry Potter series to represent Privet Drive.

On 21 March 2010, there was a fire on one of the Hogwarts sets during filming of Harry Potter and the Deathly Hallows – Part 2 at Leavesden Studios. Only a small portion of the set suffered significant damage.

In 2010, as the final Harry Potter film was nearing completion, Warner Bros. announced their intention to purchase the studio as a permanent European base, the first studio to do so since Metro-Goldwyn-Mayer in the 1940s.

=== Warner Bros. Studios Leavesden ===
Warner Bros. Studios Leavesden logo

By November 2010, Warner Bros. completed its purchase of Leavesden Studios and announced plans to invest more than £100 million into the site they had occupied for over ten years, rebranding it Warner Bros. Studios Leavesden. The studios make Warner Bros. the only Hollywood film studio with a permanent base in the United Kingdom.

Much of the redevelopment involved converting stages A to H into sound stages and equipping all the facilities with the latest fittings a production might require. The refurbished stages were conversions of the original buildings and the runway and control tower from the site's days as an aerodrome remain intact as well as all of the buildings' original structures. The full scale refurbishment and renovation of the production facilities were completed and the studios reopened to film and television work in 2012.

As part of this redevelopment Warner Bros. also created two entirely new soundstages, J & K, to house a permanent public exhibition named the Warner Bros. Studio Tour London – The Making of Harry Potter, creating 300 new jobs in the local area. Currently the whole attraction is dedicated to the making of Harry Potter and is now home to many of the series' sets, props and costumes. It was opened to the public in early 2012.

The first film to start shooting at the newly refurbished studios was Edge of Tomorrow. Though the studios are privately owned, the shooting spaces are available to rent for any production.

On 30 June 2014, Warner Bros. announced the expansion of the studio, building three new state-of-the-art stages and adding a further 10,000 m^{2} (110,000 sq ft) of office space. The announcements were made after a reception celebrating the Creative Industries, hosted by Prime Minister David Cameron, and attended by WB's CEO Kevin Tsujihara and WB UK's MD Josh Berger. Leavesden's trio of new sound-stages consist of one 3,250 m^{2} (35,000 sq ft) building and two 1,575 m^{2} (16,950 sq ft) buildings, along with 1,860 m^{2} (20,000 sq ft) of adjacent office space which were completed by the end of 2014. On the same day the filming of live-action The Legend of Tarzan got underway at the studio. Following the refurbishments, the studios are now one of the largest and most state-of-the-art secure filmmaking facilities in the world.

=== Royal opening ===
Almost twenty years after the complex was converted from aerodrome to film studios—and over a year since the completion of work on the newly refurbished studios—the site was officially opened by the Duke and Duchess of Cambridge on 26 April 2013. On their visit, they were accompanied by the Duke's brother Prince Harry and J. K. Rowling (who had been unable to attend the tour's grand opening the year before), amongst other guests. Several hundred beneficiaries of supported charities were given invitations to the Studio Tour on the day of the visit. The royal entourage visited both the tour and the studios, viewing the props and costumes from Christopher Nolan's Batman films, before conducting the site's inauguration.

=== 2019 fire ===
On 10 July 2019, a fire broke out in one of the studio's sets, and would take the fire service 15 hours to extinguish. A set for the HBO television series Avenue 5 was damaged in the fire.

== Productions ==
Films that made use of the facilities include:

=== 1990s ===
- GoldenEye (1995)
- Mortal Kombat Annihilation (1997)
- An Ideal Husband (1999)
- Onegin (1999)
- Sleepy Hollow (1999)
- Star Wars: Episode I – The Phantom Menace (1999)

=== 2000s ===
- Harry Potter and the Philosopher's Stone (2001)
- Harry Potter and the Chamber of Secrets (2002)
- Die Another Day (2002)
- Harry Potter and the Prisoner of Azkaban (2004)
- Harry Potter and the Goblet of Fire (2005)
- Harry Potter and the Order of the Phoenix (2007)
- Sweeney Todd: The Demon Barber of Fleet Street (2007)
- The Dark Knight (2008)
- Harry Potter and the Half-Blood Prince (2009)
- Sherlock Holmes (2009)

=== 2010s ===
- Harry Potter and the Deathly Hallows – Part 1 (2010)
- Inception (2010)
- Harry Potter and the Deathly Hallows – Part 2 (2011)
- Sherlock Holmes: A Game of Shadows (2011)
- Wrath of the Titans (2012)
- The Dark Knight Rises (2012)
- The Invisible Woman (2013)
- Jack Ryan: Shadow Recruit (2014)
- 300: Rise of an Empire (2014)
- Edge of Tomorrow (2014)
- Dracula Untold (2014)
- Paddington (2014)
- In the Heart of the Sea (2015)
- Jupiter Ascending (2015)
- Kingsman: The Secret Service (2015)
- The Man from U.N.C.L.E. (2015)
- Mission: Impossible – Rogue Nation (2015)
- Pan (2015)
- The Conjuring 2 (2016)
- The Legend of Tarzan (2016)
- Jason Bourne (2016)
- Fantastic Beasts and Where to Find Them (2016)
- Alien: Covenant (2017)
- The Current War (2017)
- Darkest Hour (2017)
- Justice League (2017)
- King Arthur: Legend of the Sword (2017)
- Kingsman: The Golden Circle (2017)
- The Mummy (2017)
- Paddington 2 (2017)
- Wonder Woman (2017)
- Bohemian Rhapsody (2018)
- Fantastic Beasts: The Crimes of Grindelwald (2018)
- Hunter Killer (2018)
- Mission: Impossible – Fallout (2018)
- Mowgli: Legend of the Jungle (2018)
- Overlord (2018)
- Ready Player One (2018)
- Tomb Raider (2018)
- The Kid Who Would Be King (2019)
- Detective Pikachu (2019)
- Men in Black: International (2019)
- Spider-Man: Far From Home (2019)
- Fast & Furious Presents: Hobbs & Shaw (2019)
- Last Christmas (2019)
- Cats (2019)

=== 2020s ===
- Eurovision Song Contest: The Story of Fire Saga (2020)
- The Witches (2020)
- Wonder Woman 1984 (2020)
- Tom & Jerry (2021)
- Zack Snyder's Justice League (2021)
- F9 (2021)
- Venom: Let There Be Carnage (2021)
- Last Night in Soho (2021)
- The 355 (2022)
- The Batman (2022)
- Fantastic Beasts: The Secrets of Dumbledore (2022)
- Fast X (2023)
- The Flash (2023)
- Mission: Impossible – Dead Reckoning Part One (2023)
- Barbie (2023)
- Meg 2: The Trench (2023)
- Wonka (2023)
- Aquaman and the Lost Kingdom (2023)
- Ghostbusters: Frozen Empire (2024)
- A Quiet Place: Day One (2024)
- Beetlejuice Beetlejuice (2024)
- Apartment 7A (2024)
- Venom: The Last Dance (2024)
- Blitz (2024)
- Wicked (2024)
- Kraven the Hunter (2024)
- The Gorge (2025)
- Mickey 17 (2025)
- Fountain of Youth (2025)
- Mission: Impossible – The Final Reckoning (2025)
- The Conjuring: Last Rites (2025)
- The Woman in Cabin 10 (2025)
- The Running Man (2025)
- The Family Plan 2 (2025)
- Wicked: For Good (2025)
- Wake Up Dead Man (2025)
- Supergirl (2026)
- Clayface (2026)
- Practical Magic 2 (2026)
- Panic Carefully (2027)
- The Great Beyond (2027)
- The Batman: Part II (2028)
- The Housekeeper (TBA)

Television shows that made use of the facilities include:

- Longitude (2000)
- Pennyworth (2019–2022)
- Avenue 5 (2020–2022)
- The Sandman (season 1) (2022)
- House of the Dragon (2022–present)
- You (season 4) (2023)
- The Regime (2024)
- The Franchise (2024)
- The Agency (2024)
- Harry Potter (2026–present)

The footage used for theme parks that made use of the facilities include:

- Harry Potter and the Forbidden Journey (2010)
- Harry Potter and the Escape from Gringotts (2014)
- Hagrid's Magical Creatures Motorbike Adventure (2019)

The studios have also been used for various music videos and television commercials, most notably support for the video for Jamiroquai's "Deeper Underground".

== Studio tour ==
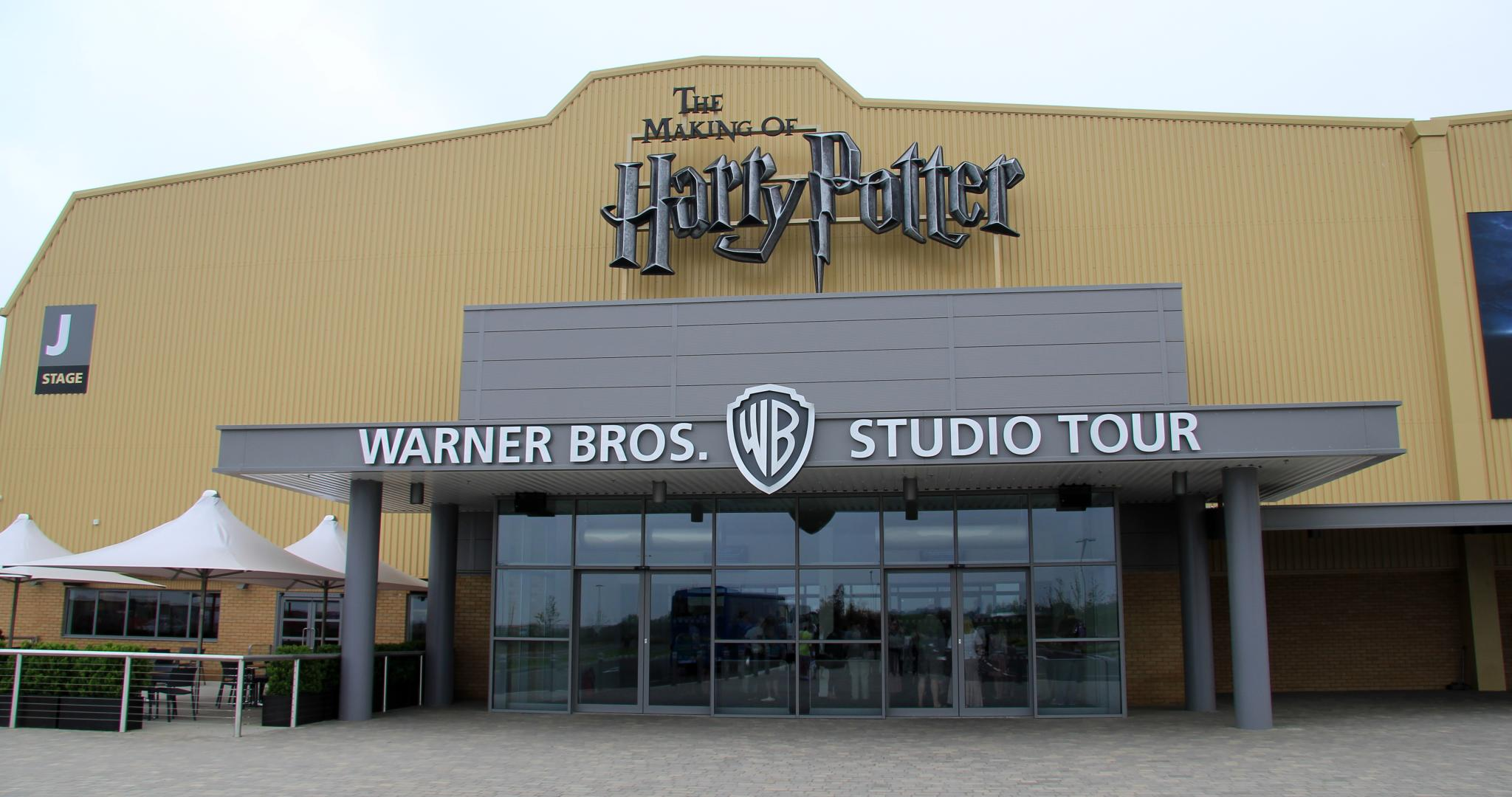
The entrance to Warner Bros. Studio Tour London – The Making of Harry Potter

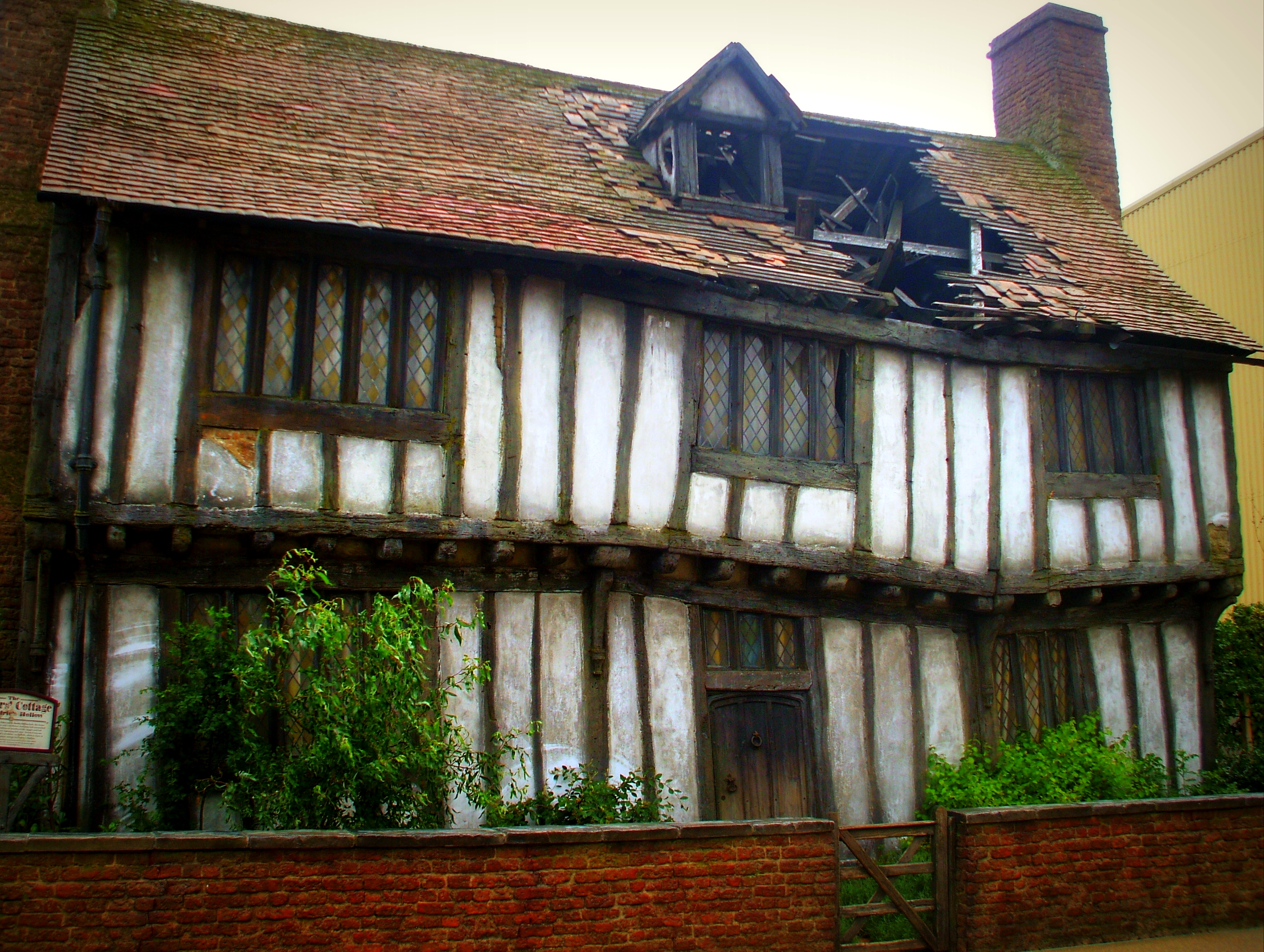
Potter's cottage, Godric's Hollow

Warner Bros. Studio Tour London – The Making of Harry Potter is a public attraction in Leavesden Hertfordshire, England. It is a permanent behind-the-scenes exhibition of the Harry Potter films.

The Studio Tour, opened to the public in early 2012. The grand opening event was attended by many of the Harry Potter film series cast and crew members.

Each tour session typically lasting three and a half hours, the studio tour has the capacity to handle up to 8,000 visitors daily. Despite Warner Bros. being the studio behind Harry Potter, the tour is not styled as a theme park, due to the fact that Warner Bros. sold the licence to do so to Universal Studios.

Though the standard tour is self-guided, various guided tours are available at an additional cost.

=== Creation ===
As early as 2001, on the heels of the success of the first film, Warner Bros. planned to build an attraction dedicated to the series in place and so began storing items from the films when they were no longer being used.

The tour's layout and overall presentation was designed by the Los Angeles-based Thinkwell Group in close collaboration with Warner Bros. and the actual filmmakers, including Production Designer Stuart Craig, Set Dresser Stephenie McMillan, Creature Designer Nick Dudman and Special Effects Supervisor John Richardson. It only includes sets, props and costumes that were actually created for or used in the production of the Harry Potter film series. Sets like the Great Hall, Dumbledore's Office, Diagon Alley, the Ministry of Magic, Gryffindor Common Room and Boys' Dormitory, Hagrid's Hut and a 1:24 scale model of Hogwarts Castle.

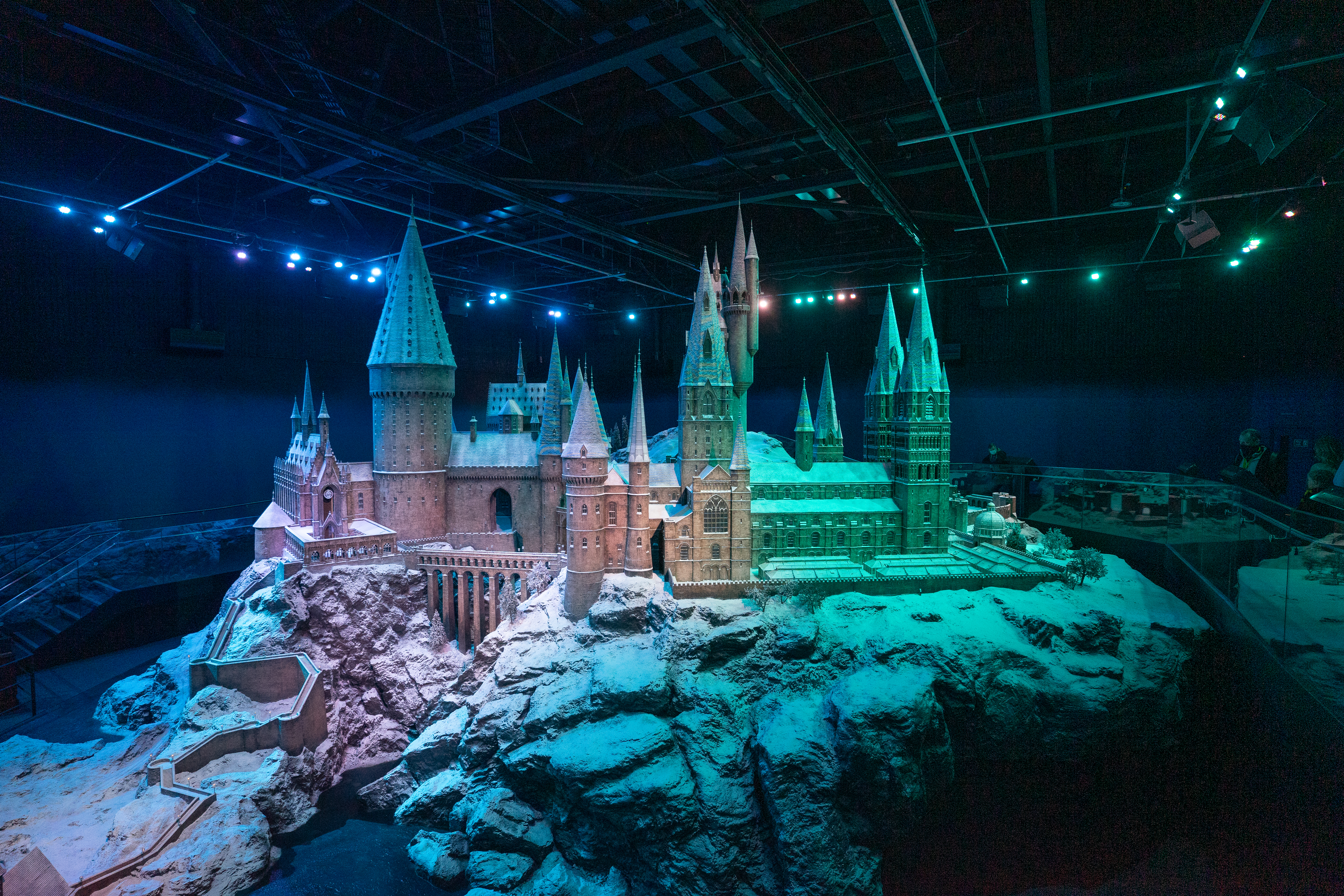
The 1:24 scale model of Hogwarts on display

=== Reception ===
Since opening in 2012, TripAdvisor has reported The Making of Harry Potter as the highest-rated attraction in the world every year since.

=== Expansions ===
Warner Bros. has continued to put on special features following a seasonal rotation, such as Dark Arts, Magical mischief and Hogwarts in the snow. Some installations like the Wand Choreography Interactive and the inside of the last No. 4 Privet Drive Exterior set have been so popular that they have remained after their respective features have closed.

In January 2015, the attraction's first expansion was announced – a new Platform 9¾ section, where visitors are able to board the original carriages behind the Hogwarts Express steam engine used in the films. The setup includes the locomotive GWR 4900 Class 5972 Olton Hall (dressed as 5972 Hogwarts Express) and the British Rail Mark 1 train that appeared in the films, brought to life by John Richardson's special effects team. Finally a new green screen experience illustrates what working on the films is like from an actor's point of view. This section opened in late March 2015.

== See also ==
- Warner Bros. Studios Burbank
- Warner Bros. Studio Tour London – The Making of Harry Potter
- Warner Bros.
- Old Warner Brothers Studio
- The Wizarding World of Harry Potter (Universal Studios)
