= Thinkwell Group =

American design and production agency

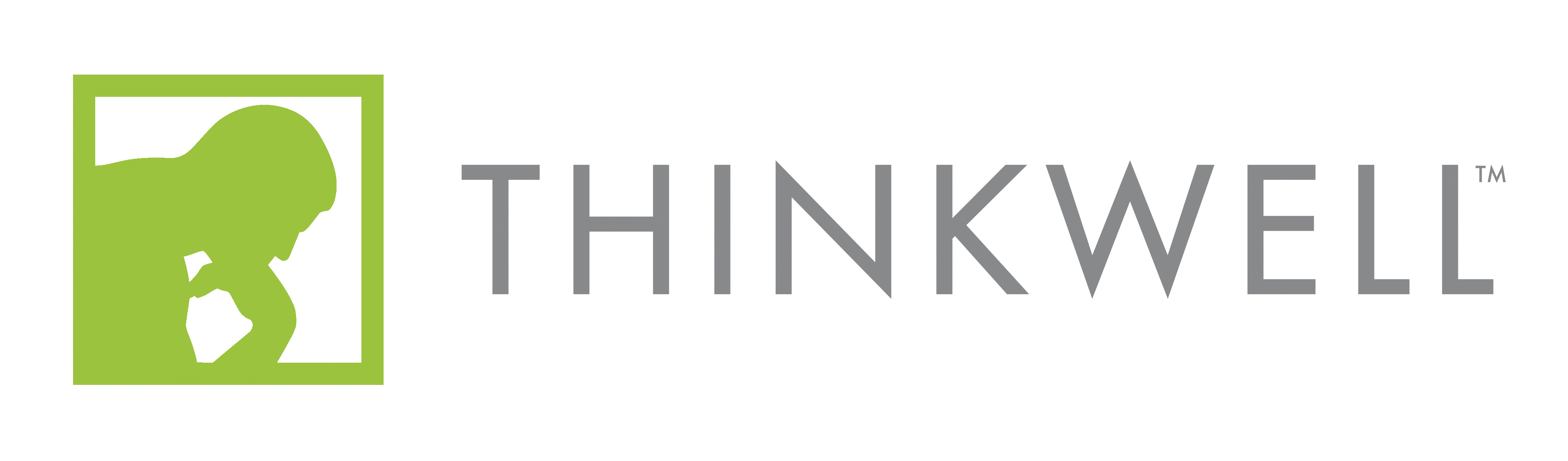
- Company type: Private company
- Industry: Experience design
- Founded: 2001
- Headquarters: Los Angeles, California, U.S.
- Key people: Joe Zenas, Partner (Chief Executive Officer); Craig Hanna (Co-Founder and Partner, Chief Creative Officer); François Bergeron (Co-Founder and Partner, Chief Operations Officer and Chief Financial Officer)
- Number of employees: Approx. 201 (2019)
- Website: thinkwellgroup.com

Thinkwell Group is an American experience design and production agency that was founded in 2001 with headquarters in Los Angeles, California. In 2022, TAIT acquired Thinkwell Group.

Since 2006, the firm has gone from approximately 35 employees to approximately 180.

== Work ==
Some of the firm's projects include Warner Bros. Studio Tour London – The Making of Harry Potter, Leavesden; Ski Dubai, an indoor ski resort in the Mall of the Emirates; NatureQuest, at Atlanta's Fernbank Museum of Natural History; the Wizarding World of Harry Potter Grand Opening Event for The Wizarding World of Harry Potter at Universal Parks and Resorts' Islands of Adventure theme park in Orlando, Florida; and Jurassic Park Institute Tour, a 50,000-square-foot traveling educational attraction based on the movie Jurassic Park.

In China, the firm has produced inEontime World, a massive indoor theme park, and SongSong Town, an "activity park" inside LeSong Plaza, both in Harbin, and Warner Bros. Fun Zone in Macau, opened in October 2015 a hotel and casino mega-resort, Studio Cit. The firm has designed Monkey Kingdom (Beijing), based on the 16th century Journey to the West Chinese folk tale, and Jurassic Dream, an indoor theme park in the Heilongjiang Province.

In 2015 the firm opened the first major expansion to the Warner Bros. Studio Tour London – The Making of Harry Potter, which includes a recreation of Platform 9 3/4 and the original Hogwarts Express train. Also for Warner Bros., the firm designed and produced the interactive attraction, Stage 48: Script to Screen at the Warner Bros. Studio Tour Hollywood. The firm also opened two museum projects, Aquanaut Adventure: A Discovery Zone at the Georgia Aquarium and the Worlds of Puppetry Museum at the Center for Puppetry Arts, the Fast & Furious: Supercharged attraction at Universal Studios Hollywood, and The Hunger Games: The Exhibition, a traveling exhibition created in partnership with Lionsgate based on The Hunger Games movie and book franchise.

The firm was contracted by Expo 2020 Dubai as content master planners and designers.
