= Greg Clarke =

English businessman and football administrator

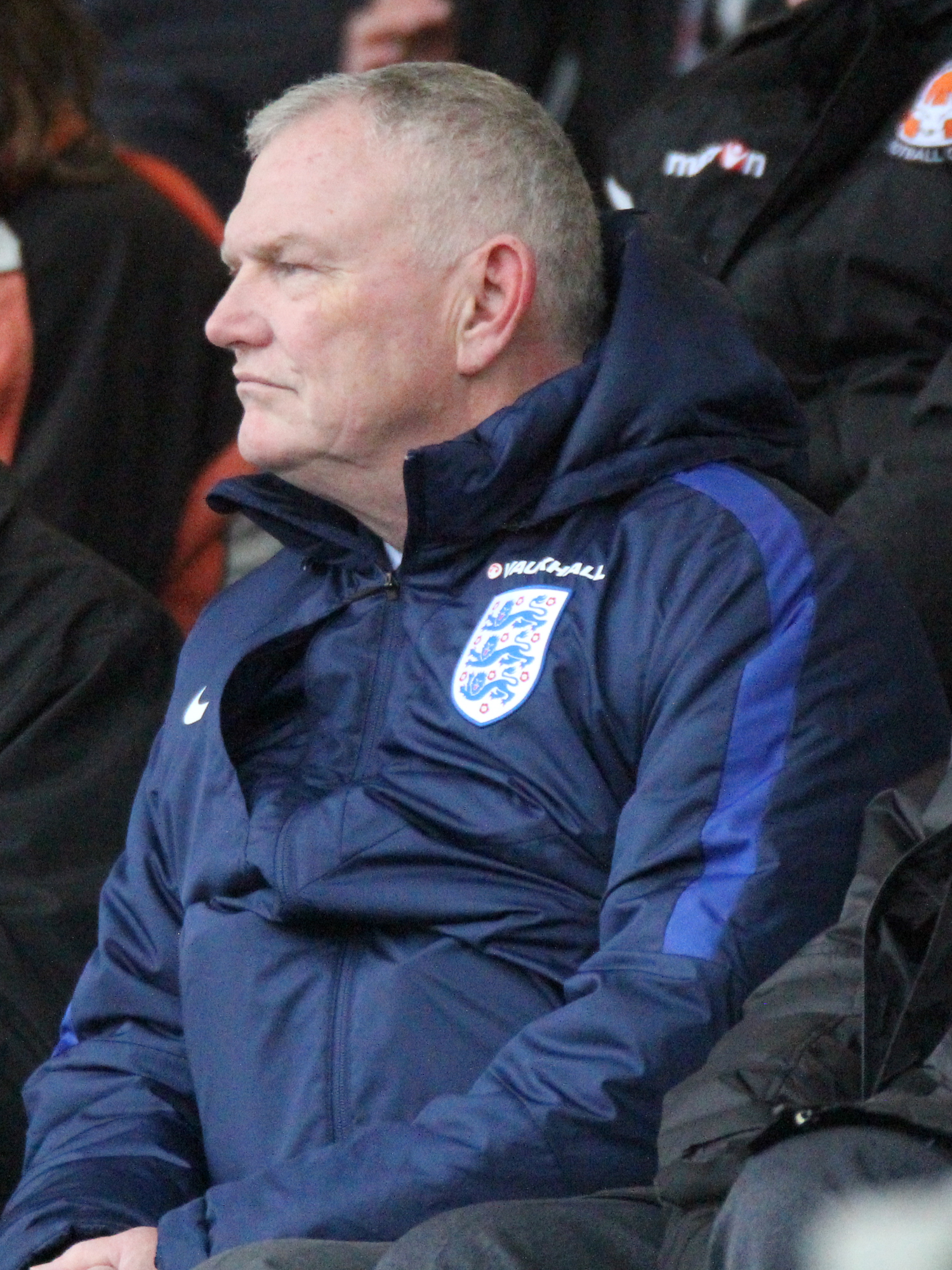
- Greg Clarke in January 2018

Vice President of FIFA
- In office 7 February 2019 – 12 November 2020
- President: Gianni Infantino

Chairman of The Football Association
- In office 4 September 2016 – 10 November 2020
- Preceded by: Greg Dyke

Personal details
- Born: 27 October 1957 (age 68) Leicester, England
- Occupation: Executive

Gregory Allison Clarke (born 27 October 1957) is an English businessman and football administrator, who was chairman of The Football Association from 4 September 2016. He resigned on 10 November 2020 after making offensive comments while talking to MPs. He was elected as the vice president of FIFA on 7 February 2019 and resigned from that role on 12 November.

== Business career ==
Clarke was born in Leicester, England. He was educated at Gateway Grammar School in Leicester.

He is currently chairman of a number of private equity-owned businesses, including Eteach UK Ltd.

From 1994 to 2000, Clarke worked in businesses for Cable & Wireless Communications, eventually as CEO up to 2000. From 2002 to 2009, he was CEO of Lendlease. After Lend Lease, he was briefly CEO of O3b Networks. He has been on the boards of Bupa and MTN.

== Football administration ==
Clarke was chairman and a director (1999–2002) of Leicester City. He was chairman of The Football League from March 2010 to June 2016.

Nominated by the FA board in July 2016, Clarke assumed the role of chairman of the FA on 4 September 2016. On 7 February 2019, Clarke was elected as a FIFA Vice President for the UEFA region at the 43rd UEFA Congress in Rome.

While FA chairman, Clarke had to lead the organisation's response to allegations of historical sexual abuse in football, and of racism and bullying in relation to the Mark Sampson and Eniola Aluko cases. In October 2017, Clarke announced a "fundamental" review of the FA after admitting it had "lost the trust of the public" following the Mark Sampson scandal.

=== Public comments ===
In October 2017 Clarke was criticised by sexual abuse victim Andy Woodward for 'humiliating' remarks Clarke made to a Digital, Culture, Media and Sport Committee hearing, while the Professional Footballers' Association's chief executive Gordon Taylor said the PFA might sue Clarke over suggestions Taylor had not supported Woodward with further counselling.

On 10 November 2020, Clarke resigned with immediate effect as the Football Association chairman following a meeting with the Department for Digital, Culture, Media and Sport, in which he referred to BAME footballers as "coloured people", said a gay footballer's decision on whether to come out was a "life choice", that "young female players did not like having the ball hit hard at them" and suggested that "different career interests" led South Asian people to choose careers in IT over sport. Clarke was talking about the racist abuse of players by trolls to the DCMS select committee via video link when making these comments. He resigned as FIFA Vice President on 12 November, again with immediate effect.

Three years before, in front of the same parliamentary committee, Clarke said the issue of institutional racism in football was "fluff". He had to apologise after being chastised by MPs and reminded that language matters and led to the FA being described as "shambolic" by a previous parliamentary enquiry.
