= Leavesden, Hertfordshire =

Coordinates: 51.6967°N 0.3991°W

Leavesden
- Location within Hertfordshire
- Population: 5,612 (ward 2011)
- OS grid reference: TL102001
- District: Three Rivers & Watford
- Shire county: Hertfordshire
- Region: East
- Country: England
- Sovereign state: United Kingdom
- Post town: WATFORD
- Postcode district: WD25
- Dialling code: 01923
- Police: Hertfordshire
- Fire: Hertfordshire
- Ambulance: East of England
- UK Parliament: South West Hertfordshire

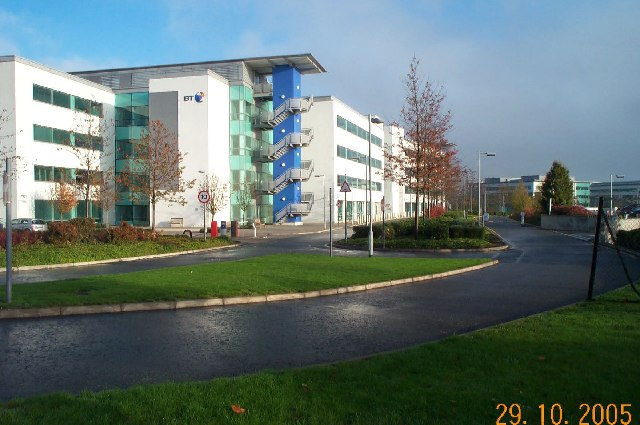
Leavesden Park Office Buildings

Leavesden is a residential and commercial area in the northern part of Watford, England. It lies within the M25 Motorway. On its eastern side it is bounded by the M1 Motorway. Leavesden is split into two councils which are Watford Borough Council and Three Rivers District Council. Leavesden Green is an adjoining residential community which lies partly in Three Rivers and partly in the Borough of Watford.

Leavesden is the location of Leavesden Studios, built on the site of RAF Leavesden a former World War II airfield and wartime aircraft factory, and where one of the James Bond, and all of the Harry Potter, film franchises were produced.

== History ==
In the period before the Norman Conquest the hamlet of Leavesden was in the hundred of Dacorum, and was historically an exclave of the ecclesiastical parish of Watford, which was in the hundred of Cashio. In the 12th century Leavesden became part of the parish of Bushey. In 1853 it became an ecclesiastical parish, and the church of All Saints and St Hilda was built in the Victorian gothic style by the architect Sir George Gilbert Scott. In 1870 the Metropolitan Asylum for Imbeciles was founded by the Metropolitan Asylums Board. Later known as Leavesden Hospital, it closed in 1997 and is now the site of Leavesden Country Park.

Before the First World War Leavesden was an agricultural community. During the 1930s several housing estates were built. In the 1950s major road network developments commenced with the building of the North Orbital Road and North Western Avenue.

Shortly after the outbreak of World War II in 1940, Leavesden Aerodrome was established. In addition to a runway suitable for heavy bombers, and associated aircraft hangars, the de Havilland company, which had plants at Hatfield, built two factories for Halifax bombers and Mosquitoes. After the war de Havillands gradually converted the factories into a gas turbine design and manufacturing facility which was subsequently transferred to the de Havilland Engine Company who operated the factories until about 1963. Together with the large scale contraction and reorganisation of the British Aircraft Industry at that time, the site was taken into ownership by Armstrong Siddeley, Hawker Siddeley, and finally Bristol Siddeley, and in the same hectic year consolidated the gas turbine businesses of Blackburn Engines and Napiers. Bristol Siddeley Engines then operated the site together with a factory at Stag Lane Edgware and a test facility at the old Hatfield site until 1968 when Bristol Siddeley Engines (by then a very profitable company) was forced to merge with Rolls-Royce by government pressure. The site continued under the Rolls-Royce name until closed by that company in 1991. Flying ceased at the end of March 1994.

Notable achievements by the engineering team were the world's first full authority electronically controlled helicopter engine and initial development of the first pedestal cooled turbine blade, now common throughout the industry. The site manufactured well over 3000 helicopter engines and designed and developed the RTM322 engine used for the UK Apache, Merlin and French NH90 aircraft. Rolls-Royce has now sold the rights to this engine to a French company, and with that transfer all helicopter engine development in the UK has effectively ceased.

Eon Productions took over the site in 1995 for the production of the James Bond film GoldenEye. Leavesden Studios were developed and acquired by Warner Bros. and parts of the former airfield were sold for housing development.

== Present day ==
Property development company MEPC plc is redeveloping the former aerodrome site, including the studio complex and adjoining land known as Leavesden Park. The plans comprise a film studio, a media and telecommunications business park, and retail outlets, and a nature reserve. In addition Bellway Homes have built 425 homes.

== Education ==
Within the Leavesden ward are the following schools.

- Primary schools: Kingsway Infant School, Alban Wood Primary School, St Catherine of Siena RC Junior Mixed Infant (JMI) School, Coates Way JMI and Nursery School, Leavesden Green JMI School and Nursery
- Secondary Schools: Parmiter's School, St. Michael's Catholic High School, Future Academies Watford
- Special School: Garston Manor School

== Sport and recreation ==
To the north, Leavesden Country Park comprising 110 acres of mature woods, parkland, football pitches, BMX track, outdoor gym, walks and playgrounds was created out of the grounds of Leavesden Hospital which closed in 1997. Some buildings have been converted for use as a Health Club. Leavesden Country Park (north) is also the home of Leavesden junior parkrun, a free, weekly, timed 2 km run for 4–14 year olds every Sunday at 9am which is entirely dependent on volunteers. Also, what was based on the old airfield site, now accessed along High Road, Leavesden sits 2F (Watford) Squadron of the Air Training Corps.

Watford Town Cricket Club has its ground at Woodside in Leavesden Green. There is a youth club in Leavesden Green. Local public houses include The Hammer in Hand, The Swan. Leavesden Green Community Centre is located to the south of the Orbital Road.

== Transport ==
=== Rail ===
The nearest mainline railway stations are King's Langley and Watford Junction.

=== Road ===
Leavesden is close to the M1 and M25 motorways, the A405 (London Orbital Road) and the A41 (North Western Avenue).

=== Air ===
Since the closure of the aerodrome at Leavesden, the nearest airport is Heathrow, 24 kilometres (15 mi) away.

=== Waterways ===
The Grand Union Canal passes to the west of Leavesden.

== Notable people ==
- Sid Kimpton (born 12 August 1887 – 15 February 1968), also known as Gabriel Sibley "Sid" Kimpton or George Kimpton, was an English football player who spent his entire playing career with Southampton and subsequently became a manager in Europe including the France National Football Team.
- Malcolm Lesiter (born 31 January 1937) was Archdeacon of Bedford from 1993 to 2003, and the incumbent at Leavesden All Saints and St Hilda's Church from 1973 to 1988.
- James Newcome (born 24 July 1953) was the Bishop of Carlisle from 2009 to 2023, and began his curacy at All Saints and St Hilda's Church Leavesden from 1979 to 1982.
- Bradley Walsh (born 4 June 1960), an English entertainer, actor, television presenter and former professional footballer, was born and grew up in Leavesden.
