= Green brothers =

Partnership between brothers Hank and John Green

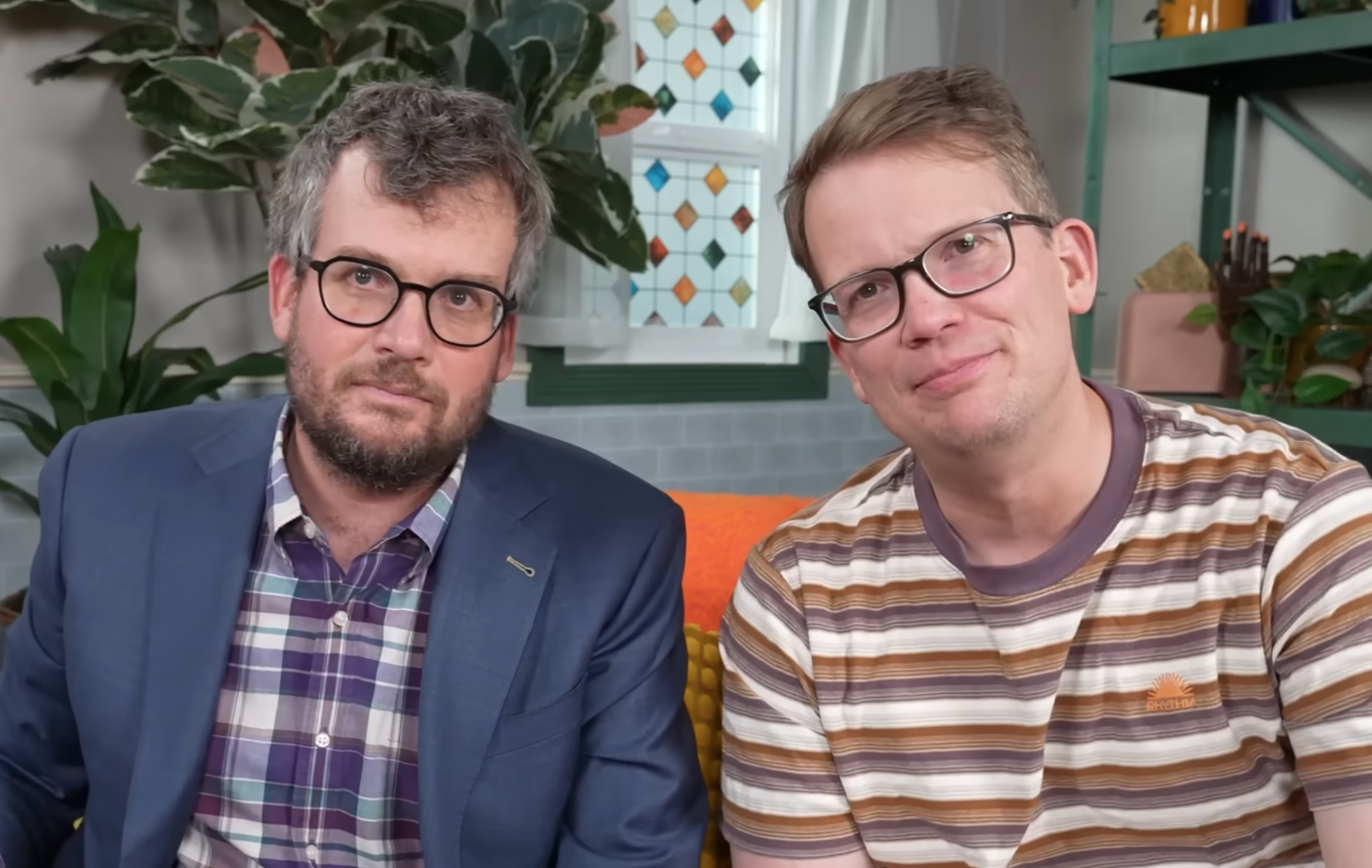
- John (left) and Hank Green (right) in 2025
- Occupations: YouTube vloggers; authors; entrepreneurs; philanthropists
- Years active: 2007–present
- Known for: Co-founders of VidCon; Complexly
- Notable work: Vlogbrothers; Crash Course; Dear Hank & John
- William Henry Green II
- Born: May 5, 1980 (age 46); Birmingham, Alabama, U.S.
- John Michael Green
- Born: August 24, 1977 (age 49); Indianapolis, Indiana, U.S.
- Website: hankandjohn.com

The Green brothers, Hank (born 1980) and John (born 1977), are two American entrepreneurs, social activists, authors, and YouTube vloggers. The two have collaborated extensively throughout their public careers, beginning with a daily vlog project in 2007 titled "Brotherhood 2.0", in which they only communicated in vlogs posted to YouTube for a year. The Greens' portfolio of online work now includes their main Vlogbrothers channel, Crash Course, SciShow, their podcast Dear Hank & John, and several other projects spanning several forms of media.

Both brothers have found success individually. John has written several books which have received widespread acclaim and popularity, including The Fault in Our Stars. The novel was made into a 2014 film adaptation, which was number one at the box office during its opening weekend and grossed over $307 million worldwide. Hank has founded several companies, including "EcoGeek", a blog dedicated to environmentally beneficial advancements in technology. The blog was originally a class project of Hank's, while he studied at the University of Montana, but eventually progressed into becoming an environmental publication, which would grab the attention of Time. The company has since evolved into Complexly, the parent company for most of the Green brothers' projects. Hank co-founded the record label and e-commerce merchandise company DFTBA Records with Alan Lastufka and his debut novel, An Absolutely Remarkable Thing and its sequel A Beautifully Foolish Endeavor debuted as New York Times best sellers.

Together, the two brothers are credited with creating what some have described as a "YouTube media" or "online multimedia" empire. Their collaborative works which include projects centered on education, gaming, and activism, among others, have amassed an active fanbase known as "Nerdfighteria". Other projects founded by the brothers include the online-video conference VidCon and the annual charity event Project for Awesome.

== Online video and audio projects ==
=== Vlogbrothers ===
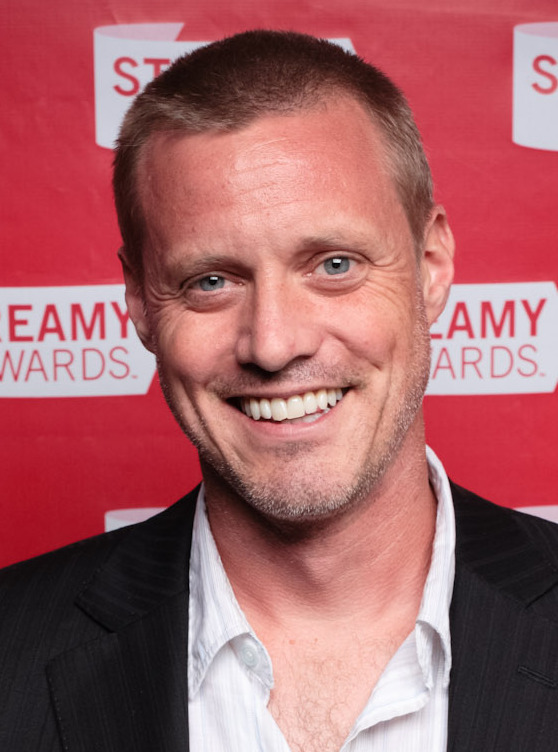
Ze Frank was a heavy inspiration of Brotherhood 2.0.

On January 1, 2007, after being heavily inspired by the show with zefrank, the Greens launched the Vlogbrothers channel. Another inspiration for the project was the video blog lonelygirl15. The project was originally meant to be a year-long way to deepen the bond between the brothers, creating a new outlet to communicate to each other. Hank has stated that prior to the video blog, the two "didn't ever talk, really". The project, titled "Brotherhood 2.0", quickly grew an audience, leading to the Greens' success on YouTube. On their following, Hank has stated, "We were never really shouting into the void. There were always people following us. Even if it was just a couple dozen people, they were really engaged." The New Yorker has described the Vlogbrothers channel as "the anchor of an online empire".

The topics of videos on the channel vary widely, as the Greens speak about whatever is on their minds at the time. The first majorly successful Vlogbrothers video, "Accio Deathly Hallows", uploaded on July 18, 2007, was a song about the impending release of Harry Potter and the Deathly Hallows. The video was featured on YouTube's front page, earned over 1 million views, now has almost 2 million views, and introduced the brothers to the Harry Potter fandom. Another video, in which John announces his support for his friend, mathematician and politician, Daniel Biss, was covered by The Wall Street Journal.

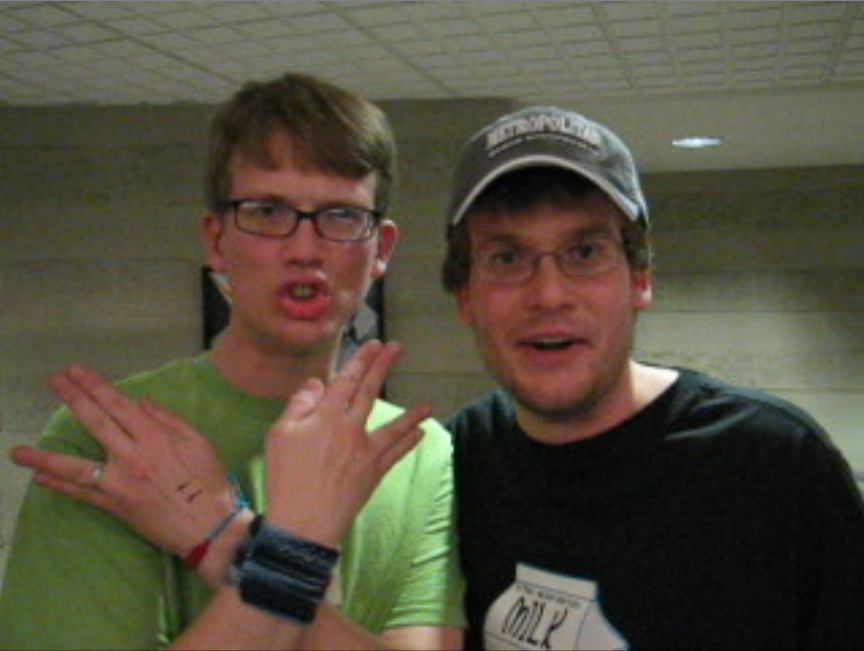
The Green brothers in 2008

The Brotherhood 2.0 project would end on December 31, 2007, but the Greens announced in their final Brotherhood 2.0 vlog that they would continue creating videos. The channel and its fanbase would grow past Brotherhood 2.0, and eventually in 2013, it reached the 1 million subscriber threshold. The brothers have continued to work on the channel, with Hank stating, "I'm so happy that we get to keep doing vlogbrothers and that people still care about vlogbrothers", adding, "that's still the thing I do. Everything else is just an extension of that thing."

=== Educational channels ===
Since gaining a dedicated following through Vlogbrothers, the Green brothers have constantly sought to educate their viewers on various topics. The two have launched and worked on several educational channels since late 2011 under the banner of their company, Complexly, including Crash Course, SciShow and its spinoffs, The Brain Scoop, Sexplanations, How to Adult, The Financial Diet, and Mental Floss. Several of these channels successfully spun off to be sustained by their creators independently of the Greens' original influence.

In a 2014 interview with The Washington Post, John Green stated, "I think people support Crash Course and SciShow because they want for Crash Course and SciShow to exist and they believe in our mission to make educational content for free, for everyone, for ever." The brothers have been described as "one of the main voices in YouTube's vibrant education community".

==== Crash Course and SciShow ====
Crash Course is an educational channel that was launched on January 26, 2012, by the Green brothers as part of the YouTube Original Channel Initiative. Initially, John presented the humanities courses, while Hank presented the sciences, though the channel has since expanded to include other hosts such as Craig Benzine and Phil Plait. The graphics of Crash Course videos are created by Thought Café (formerly Thought Bubble).

SciShow is a series of science-related videos hosted by Hank and a rotating cast of co-hosts. SciShow, like Crash Course, was launched as part of the YouTube Original Channel Initiative on January 2, 2012. Several scientific fields are covered by SciShow. Among these are organic and thermodynamic chemistry, physics, geology, climatology, astronomy and astrophysics, evolutionary biology, psychology and several miscellaneous fields. The topics on videos uploaded onto SciShow varied; for example, one video detailed the origins of "cute". SciShow landed a national advertisement campaign deal with YouTube, in 2014. As a result, the channel was promoted through several platforms, including billboard ads, as well as a television commercial featured during the fifth season premiere of The Walking Dead.

SciShow has yielded several spin-off channels, including SciShow Space (2014–2023), dedicated to space-related news, discoveries, and space-related science; SciShow Kids (2015–2018, and since 2020), specializing in delivering science topics to children; and SciShow Psych (2017–2022), specializing in psychology and neuroscience.

==== Other educational channels ====
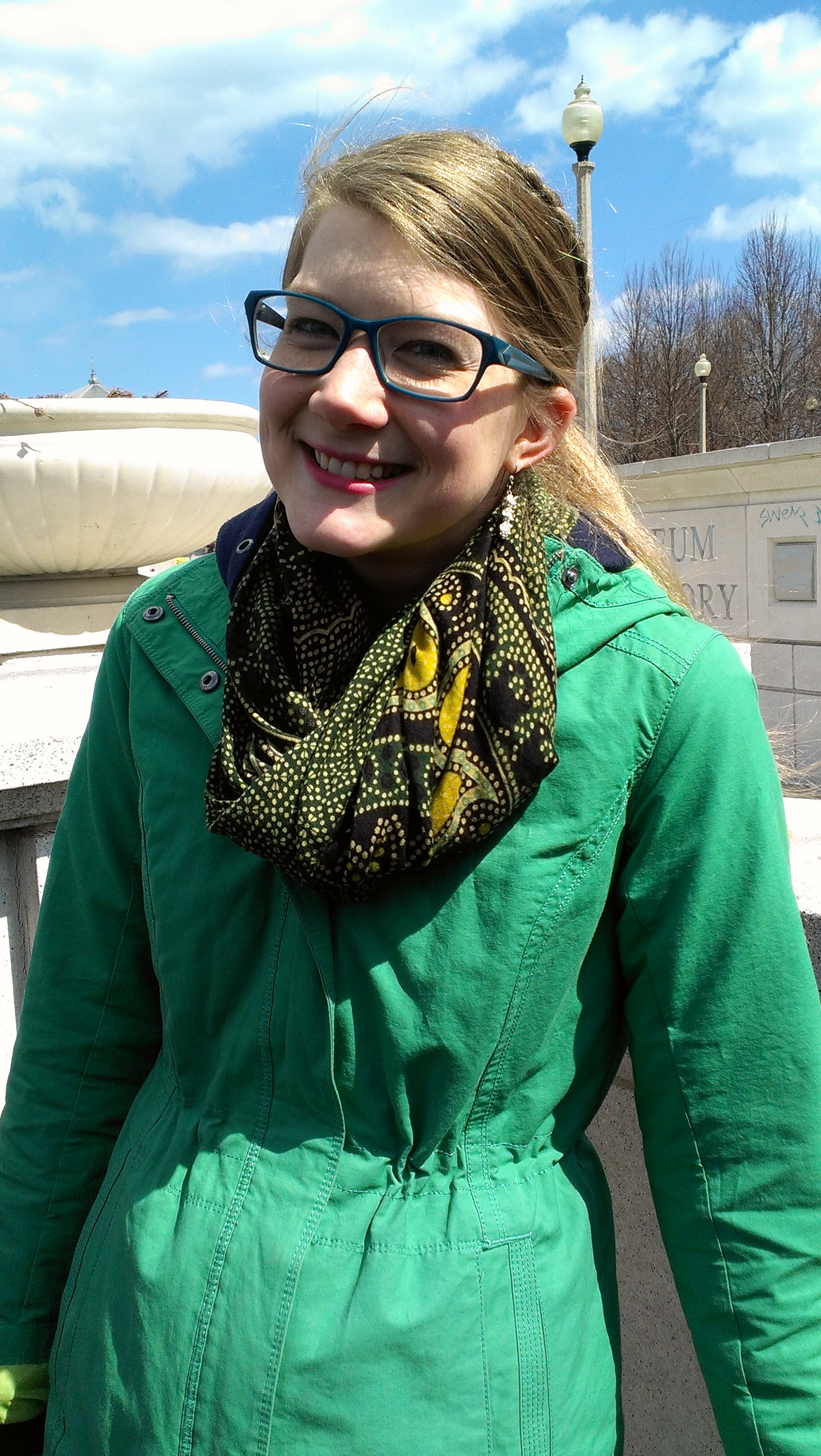
Emily Graslie, host of The Brain Scoop

Additionally, Hank Green helped Emily Graslie to launch The Brain Scoop in early 2013. The channel focuses on taxidermy, biology, and natural history. Prior to the channel's launch, Hank Green featured Graslie giving a tour of the University of Montana's Philip L. Wright Zoological Museum on one of his Vlogbrothers videos. Green's fans positively responded to video, suggesting for Graslie to host her own channel, leading Green to e-mail Graslie with an offer to assist her in the launch of this channel. Green later announced that the channel would launch in January 2013, helping the channel to spike to 20,000 subscribers prior to its first upload. The channel would upload videos from Montana, until Graslie became employed at Chicago's Field Museum of Natural History. In December 2014, the brothers sold the channel for an undisclosed sum, to the Chicago-based museum. Regarding this transaction, Hank stated, "We helped create The Brain Scoop with Emily and Michael Aranda of our studio because she was just so passionate and enthusiastic about science, history, and her work. I am so proud and pleased that The Brain Scoop and Emily have found what is absolutely their best possible home."

Another educational channel, Mental Floss, based on the magazine of the same name, was launched in February 2013. John hosted the channel's first series, The List Show, through December 2017. Prior to becoming a published novelist, Green had written for the magazine, and had attended Indian Springs School with the magazine's first editor, Neely Harris. The channel's success was described in 2014 as "somewhat of an outlier in the magazine industry", by The New York Times, as videos on the channel have outgained videos on other channels launched by magazine companies, such as Wired, and Vogue. The channel later added to its library of videos, launching The Big Question, and Misconceptions hosted by Craig Benzine and Elliott Morgan, respectively. Emerson College's Entertainment Monthly paper listed Mental Floss, as well as the aforementioned Crash Course as top five educational YouTube channels.

Beginning in June 2013, Hank Green served as the executive producer for Sexplanations, a channel dedicated to open and honest conversation and information about sex-related topics hosted by clinical sexologist Lindsey Doe. The February 27, 2019 episode of Sexplanations was the last to credit Green as an executive producer.

In February 2014, Hank and John Green announced a new channel, How to Adult. The channel, aimed at young people who have recently entered adulthood, is "dedicated to teaching everything you need to know how to do as an adult that school never got around to". Until August 2016, the channel was hosted by vlogger Emma Mills (known as "Elmify" on YouTube) and Young Adult novelist T. Michael Martin. After a brief interregnum, the channel relaunched in March 2017 with Hank Green hosting alongside Rachel Calderon Navarro. Both Green brothers served as the channel's executive producers through its conclusion in April 2018.

Hank Green also served as executive producer of The Financial Diet, a personal finance advice channel, directed toward young adults and particularly young women, from its September 2015 launch until mutually and amicably separating from the project a few years later.

=== Dear Hank & John ===
On June 7, 2015, the Green brothers started a weekly podcast titled Dear Hank & John. The podcast is produced by Rosianna Halse Rojas and edited by Josef "Tuna" Metesh. The show's theme music is by Gunnarolla. Each episode typically begins with an opening segment in which they introduce the show as "a podcast where two brothers answer your questions, give you dubious advice and bring you all the weeks news from both Mars and AFC Wimbledon," after which Hank tells a dad joke. During the main portion of the show, the brothers read questions sent to them from their listeners, and respond with (often comedic) takes on the question. Before the actual midroll advertisements, the brothers plug various fictional sponsors of the show in a humorous manner that references topics from that week. The show then concludes with Hank delivering the news about Mars and John delivering the news about AFC Wimbledon football club, before reading the credits at the show's close.

As of April 2025, over 400 episodes of the podcast have been released, each typically around 40 minutes in length. An exclusive Dear Hank & John episode has been made as a perk for the annual Project for Awesome fundraising campaign each year since 2015. On a number of occasions, one of the brothers was absent from a number of episodes (for example, during the publicity tours for Paper Towns, Turtles All The Way Down, and An Absolutely Remarkable Thing); various friends and family members of the brothers filled in on those occasions.

When the podcast debuted, it reached the number 4 position on the US iTunes performance chart and hit a peak position of number 2 two days later. The podcast is primarily funded through the crowdfunding website Patreon, though the majority of the pledges go towards the video production budget of Complexly. From November 2018 to November 2020, the podcast was a co-production of Complexly and WNYC Studios. As of November 16, 2020, Dear Hank & John is once again an independently produced podcast. Starting in May 2023, the show went on indefinite hiatus following Hank's diagnosis of Hodgkin lymphoma; his treatment, and John's need to fill in for many of his work duties, kept the brothers from recording. Regular recordings returned in October 2023, but with some modifications allowing a more casual structure.

=== Other online projects ===
Aside from the aforementioned projects, the Greens also created a sub-project of Vlogbrothers called Truth or Fail, an interactive game show on YouTube. The game is often themed, and consists of five rounds of two statements each, relating to the theme, with one statement being true, and the other being false.

Hank also launched a gaming channel, Hankgames, in November 2010. It originally featured Hank, his wife Katherine, John, and occasionally Charlotte McDonnell (formerly Charlie McDonnell) and Michael Aranda playing video games such as Minecraft, New Super Mario Bros. Wii, and FIFA 11. Over time, the channel's videos were increasingly made by John, typically uploading commentary over his FIFA gameplay. This led Hank to briefly post content to a separate gaming channel, "Games With Hank", which was active in 2014 and 2015.

Although the Hankgames channel went dormant in April 2020, John began streaming to his personal channel, johnschannel1007, in August 2024, including FIFA content. John's continued devotion for both the video game series and English football has led to Nerdfighteria being an official sponsor of the real football club AFC Wimbledon.

The Green brothers have also helped launch modernized adaptations of classic novels. The production company behind these is Pemberley Digital, which according to Hank Green's Reddit userpage, he helped co-create. The first of these adaptations was The Lizzie Bennet Diaries on YouTube in early 2012. The Lizzie Bennet Diaries was a web series adaptation of Jane Austen's novel Pride and Prejudice. In 2013, The Lizzie Bennet Diaries won an Emmy Award for Original Interactive Program. Following the conclusion of the series, Emma Approved, a web series adaptation of Emma, another Austen novel, was launched in October 2013. In 2014, Pemberley Digital launched Frankenstein, MD, an adaptation of Mary Shelley's novel, Frankenstein, in collaboration with PBS Digital Studios.

In February 2014, The Art Assignment was launched by PBS Digital Studios, featuring John's wife, Sarah Urist Green. John served as an executive producer for the series through its conclusion in August 2020.

== Business ventures and philanthropy ==
=== Complexly ===
Complexly, Inc. is an online video and audio production studio, based in Missoula, Montana, and Indianapolis, Indiana. The Green brothers cofounded Complexly in 2012 as a company and were previously co-CEOs. However, in February 2026, the brothers donated their equity to restructure the company as a 501(c)(3) nonprofit, with Hank sitting in the board of directors and John acting as founder emeritus. In 2012, the Greens began producing educational video content with the YouTube channels Crash Course and SciShow, and in the years since have created many other channels and podcasts which have been folded into the studio. Originally named EcoGeek LLC, it was founded by Hank to support his blog on environmental and science issues and was renamed in 2016. Also associated with Complexly's business, but separate to its operation, are VidCon, DFTBA Records, and the Project for Awesome. The business affairs of the Greens' personal projects, such as the YouTube channel Vlogbrothers, are handled by Complexly, but the studio does not directly produce their content. The studio's strengths in educational content has led to them being approached by institutions like PBS and the Poetry Foundation to co-produce content. In November 2018, Complexly fully launched a co-production arrangement with WNYC Studios for three regular podcasts; two had been produced independently before, one was new (but adapted from an old format). Two years later the co-production was ended, and Complexly now produces the shows on its own.

=== VidCon ===
In 2010, VidCon was launched by the brothers. Since its launch, VidCon has annually increased its attendance to become the largest in-person gathering of online video creators, viewers, and representatives. On VidCon's purpose, Hank Green stated "Even when VidCon was just 1,000 people in a hotel, it was our goal for the conference to reflect the growth and culture of the online video industry", later adding, "VidCon's exponential growth over the last four years is indicative of online video's impact on the entertainment industry and on our everyday lives."

=== DFTBA Records ===
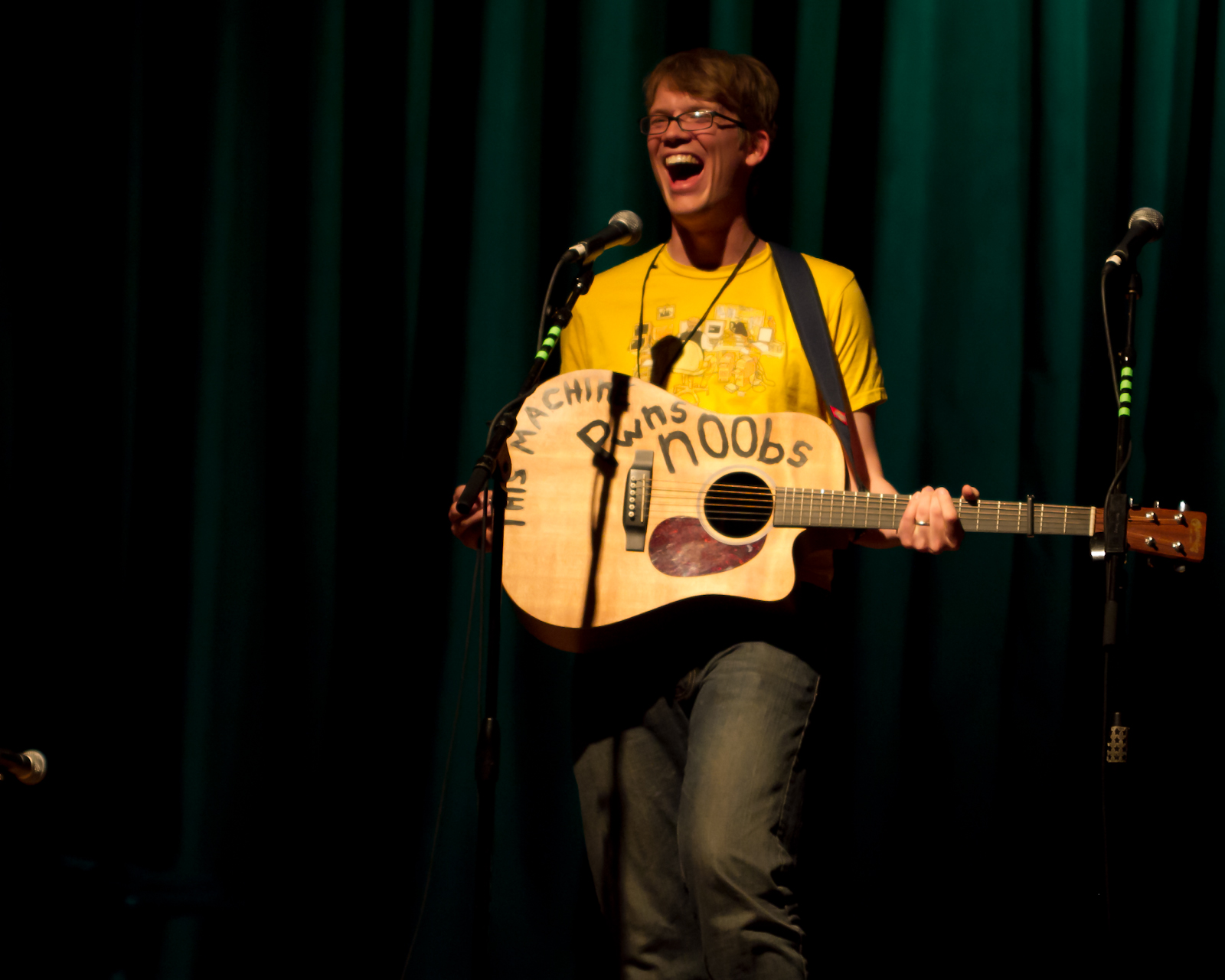
Hank Green performing at w00tstock

In 2008, Hank Green and fellow musician Alan Lastufka founded DFTBA Records. The distribution of merchandise is largely independent. In 2009, the record label caught the attention of YouTube, who praised the label on its official blog. DFTBA Records launched a series called The Warehouse on its YouTube channel, where it documents new products and announces events. DFTBA Records' merchandise extends past music, and includes merchandise such as T-shirts and posters.

In March 2014, several artists and creators signed under DFTBA Records were at the center of controversial sexual abuse cases. These artists were dropped from the label, and both Hank and John responded to these circumstances, and began working with a group of Nerdfighters, including "survivors of sexual abuse", to begin a "task force against abuse and assault". Additionally, Hank posted a video onto the Vlogbrothers channel, and in it, he discussed sexual abuse, sexual consent, as well as the culture surrounding sexual activities.

In June 2014, Lastufka announced that would be selling his entire stake in DFTBA Records, and resigning as the label's president, to pursue other projects. During an interview, Lastufka stated "Over the last few years I worked on the big ideas or product designs less and less, as my position transformed into brokering deals with brick and mortar stores and meeting with cart developers", and added "I would get a little jealous when art assignments that once went to me by default were being hired out because I just didn't have the time."

=== Subbable ===
On July 26, 2013, Hank Green made a video announcing the introduction of Subbable, a crowdfunding system to support various web series (both entertainment- and education-oriented). Users subscribe to creators and decide how much they want to pay to receive their content on either a recurring basis or with a one-time donation. The money that users spend to support various projects goes into a "perk bank" and can be redeemed for creator-determined perks such as signed posters or shoutouts in videos. The money that users donate goes immediately and directly to each creator, minus five percent of revenue that goes to Subbable itself to pay for overhead and server costs and roughly five percent that goes to Amazon to process payments. Subbable was originally created as a crowdfunding system to continue the production of CrashCourse at the termination of the two-year Google grant that funded the project. Additionally, Subbable presents a $0 subscription option, offering the subscriber access to special emails, behind the scenes videos and live shows.

Hank, who has been described as "idealistic" for the idea, explained that donations to projects on Subbable are voluntary, stating in his video, "We're asking, and this is weird, for you to pay for content because you want to, not because you're forced to. This is a weird cultural shift." John emphasized the point of the crowdfunding system's voluntary nature, "If you're authentic toward your community and don't focus on the ads, your audience will support you."

In March 2015, Subbable was acquired by Patreon. As part of the deal with Patreon, all 24 content creators signed to Subbable switched over to Patreon, and John joined Patreon as an advisor. Prior to the deal, Hank was already on the Patreon team as an advisor.

=== Project for Awesome ===
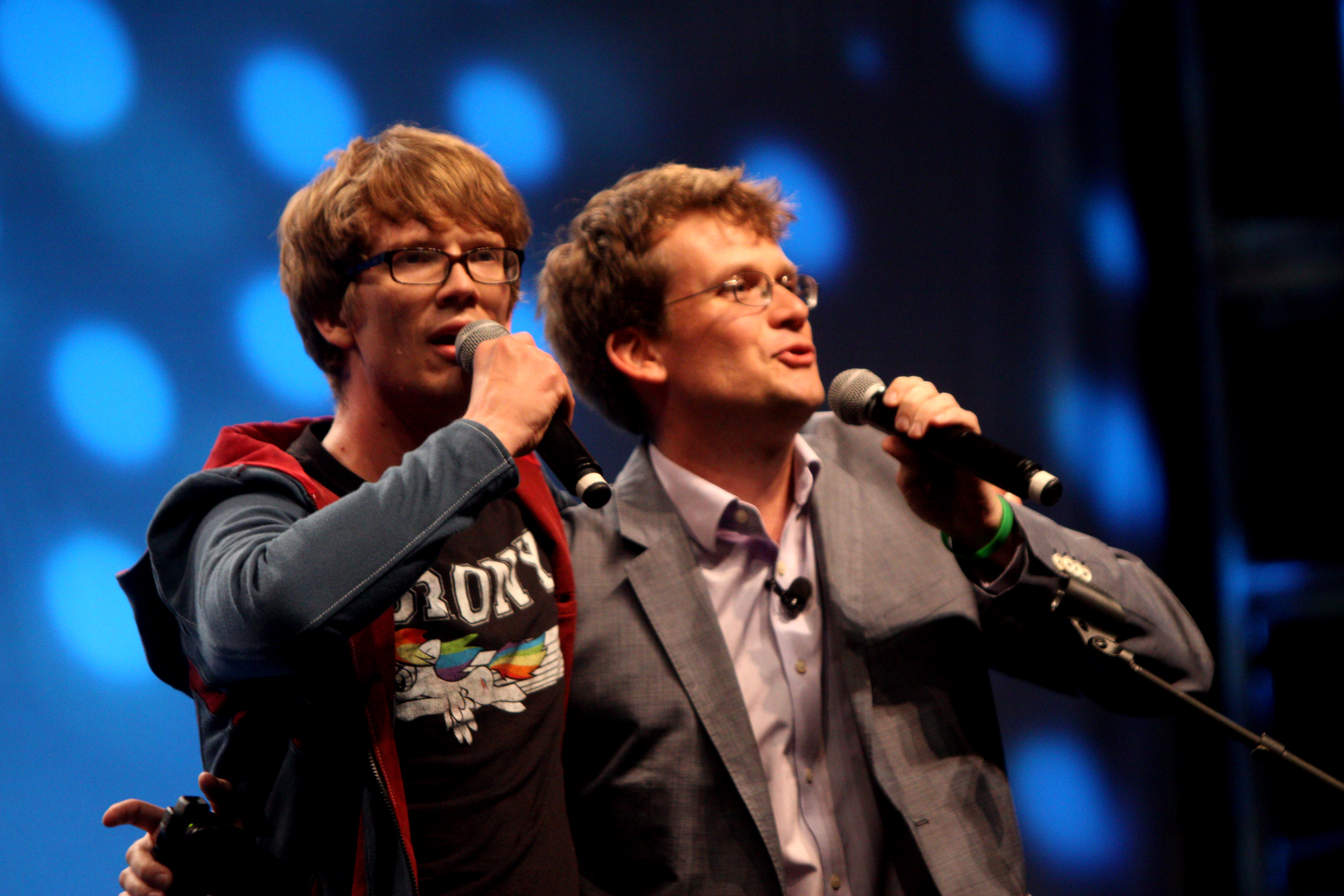
John and Hank at VidCon 2012

In December 2007, the two launched Project for Awesome, a charitable movement driven by the YouTube community. Legally, Project for Awesome is a project of the Greens' Montana-based charitable organization, the Foundation to Decrease World Suck, Inc. The 2014 event raised over $1 million, and may have been responsible for the IndieGoGo site-wide crash which occurred just as they broke the million-dollar threshold. The project has donated to a variety of charity organizations. During the project's first year, Hank Green stated, "There were more than 400 videos posted, but several people focused on humanitarian organizations in Darfur, UNICEF, Autism Speaks, The Humane Society, Toys for Tots, World Wildlife Fund, I'm proud to say that it's a very long list."

=== Good Store ===

In November 2020, the brothers started the Awesome Socks Club, a monthly subscription service where members receive a pair of socks designed by independent artists. All post-tax profits are donated to the charity Partners in Health, in a business model similar to Newman's Own products. As of March 2022, the Awesome Socks Club had 45,000 members.

In March 2022, the brothers started the Awesome Coffee Club, with an identical business model and goal to the Awesome Socks Club. The coffee is ethically sourced from Colombia via the brothers' sourcing partner Sucafina. The beans are then roasted in St. Louis, Missouri, and distributed through DFTBA's fulfillment center in Missoula, Montana.

In 2022, all the products were brought under the branding of the Good Store.

== Views ==
The Green brothers have discussed several educational, political, philosophical, and moral topics in their videos. Speaking about what subjects he would like to teach on the Crash Course channel, John stated, "I'm very interested in economics and personal finance (I sometimes post at r/personalfinance) and literature and philosophy and anthropology and the list goes on and on." Both Hank and John have been referred to as philosophers of sorts. Additionally, the Greens have been described as "charismatic, real, charmingly nerdy, and unquestionably talented", as well as "funny – an insightful, inclusive, not mean kind of funny", by The Wire, a sister site of The Atlantic. In their youth, the Greens' parents encouraged the brothers to discuss big issues at the dinner table, and John often argued about philosophy and ethics.

=== Online video ===
Both John and Hank have expressed their liking for online video as a platform and culture. Their careers are heavily invested upon online video, and in 2010, they founded the aforementioned VidCon. Hank and John founded the event, believing that somebody else would do so eventually, and that video blogging was becoming more of an industry. Hank has been documented to be active in the crowdfunding field, and would establish Subbable, allowing online content creators to have an alternative funding source aside from video advertising.

In a 2015 speech spoken to advertising executives at YouTube's Brandcast event, John stated, "I and the most passionate creators on YouTube ... we're not in the distraction business. We're in the community business, and number of eyeballs is a terrible metric for my business." John elaborated on his valuing of engagement and connection over raw viewing numbers stating, "I don't care how many people watch or read something I make. I care how many people love what I make."

=== Religion ===
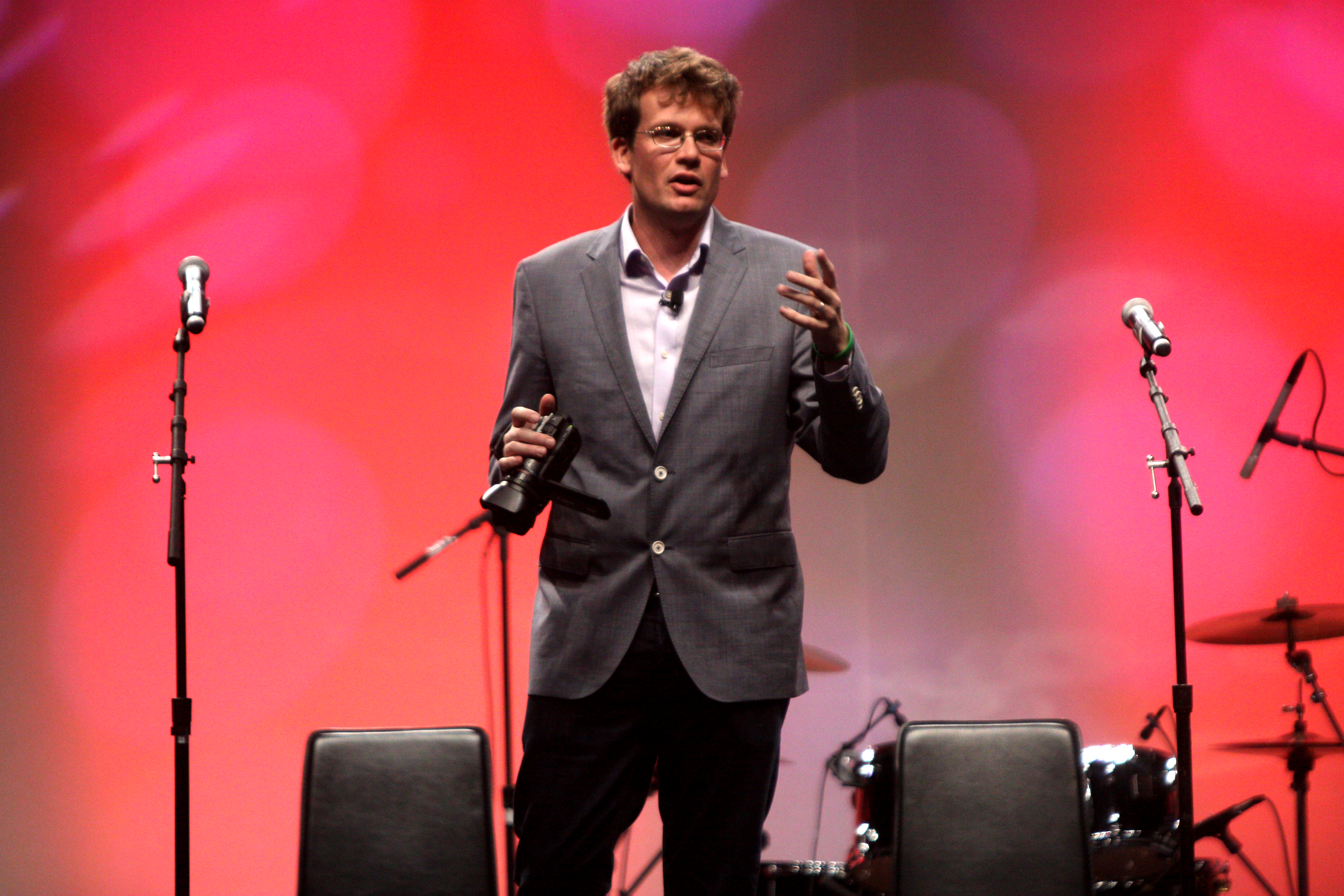
John Green in 2012

The Green brothers have discussed religion in their videos. However, in one video, John states that religion is a, "topic we've been reluctant to discuss over the years, mostly because the quality of discourse about religion on the internet is atrocious."

On his website, John writes that he is a Christian, introducing a blog post with, "I don't talk about it very often, but I'm a religious person. In fact, before I became a writer, I wanted to be a minister. There is a certain branch of Christianity that has so effectively hijacked the word 'Christian' that I feel uncomfortable sometimes using it to describe myself. But I am a Christian." He has also stated, in an interview, that he belongs to the Episcopal Church. At the same time, John disagrees with the notion that creationism should be brought back into schools' educational curriculums, stating, "What science has taught us does not invalidate religious faith, and to those evangelical Christians who believe otherwise, I would respectfully say that you are placing too much faith in the power of science." Green adds, "Science has given so much to the experience of being a creature on this planet. But it does not render our spiritual lives irrelevant." Additionally, John, has stated, "Ultimately, there are Muslims who I have more theologically in common with than many of my fellow Christians." Early in his YouTube career, John made jokes about Young Earth creationism, which offended some viewers. Although he stood by his pro-evolution beliefs, he also apologized for his comments, stating, "It's a privilege to have a platform to talk about things you care about, but it's an irrevocable privilege. I try to take it seriously", adding, "It's wrong to make people feel other and separate."

Hank, too, has been reluctant to discuss his religion. In 2011, he responded to his reluctance to answer questions regarding his religion, stating, "People are asking, because they want to inform their opinions of me with this little one word answer that says so very little about who I actually am." Later in 2016, during a podcast, Hank expressed, "I'm so jealous of religious people, man. They just know what to do." On May 22, 2023, shortly after announcing his diagnosis of Hodgkin lymphoma, Hank answered "I don't have a god, but I believe that people caring about people matters to people, and praying is one of many ways we show that we care about each other", when asked if he would feel comfortable receiving prayers.

=== Existentialism and human complexity ===
The biggest problem with being alive is that you can only see the world out of your eyes. You can only live inside of your skin, your consciousness. You can't effectively imagine what it's like to be someone else. But the study of history allows you to empathize better, it allows you to think more complexly about others. And that's gonna be useful to you not just on AP tests, but in every single moment of your entire life.

— John Green, Crash Course (2014)

The Greens have often discussed the topic of existential anxiety and an existential crisis. John, in particular, has included themes of existentialism in his novels, notably, The Fault in Our Stars. The two main characters of the novel, Hazel and Augustus, bond over existentialism and philosophy. Another theme in Green's works, including The Fault in Our Stars, is the complex imagination of others. Green has commented on the character of aforementioned Nerdfighter, Esther Earl, stating she, "had a wonderful gift for imagining others and for imagining them very complexly". Green incorporated this aspect of Earl's personality into the novel. Additionally, Green has stated, "while the world talks about young people's insularity and solipsism, they're creating a fascinating and complex world of deep engagement online, a world in which they are not just watching content but becoming part of it by being community members whose comments and fanfiction and artwork and passion have profound impacts on the broader culture."

Hank has spoken about human dreams of success. On the topic, Hank has stated, "There are problems with the institutions of dreams, [but] I am in favor of them. We need something to push us to work 16-hour days sometimes. We need something to drive us to be better, and weirder, and different, but I think if we let that one thing drive us, it's a failure of imagination, and we miss opportunities." Hank would add, "In the end, it's not about finding success, it's about building the number of things you're capable of, because then you could do more interesting things, and we need people to do interesting things in the world."

=== Politics ===
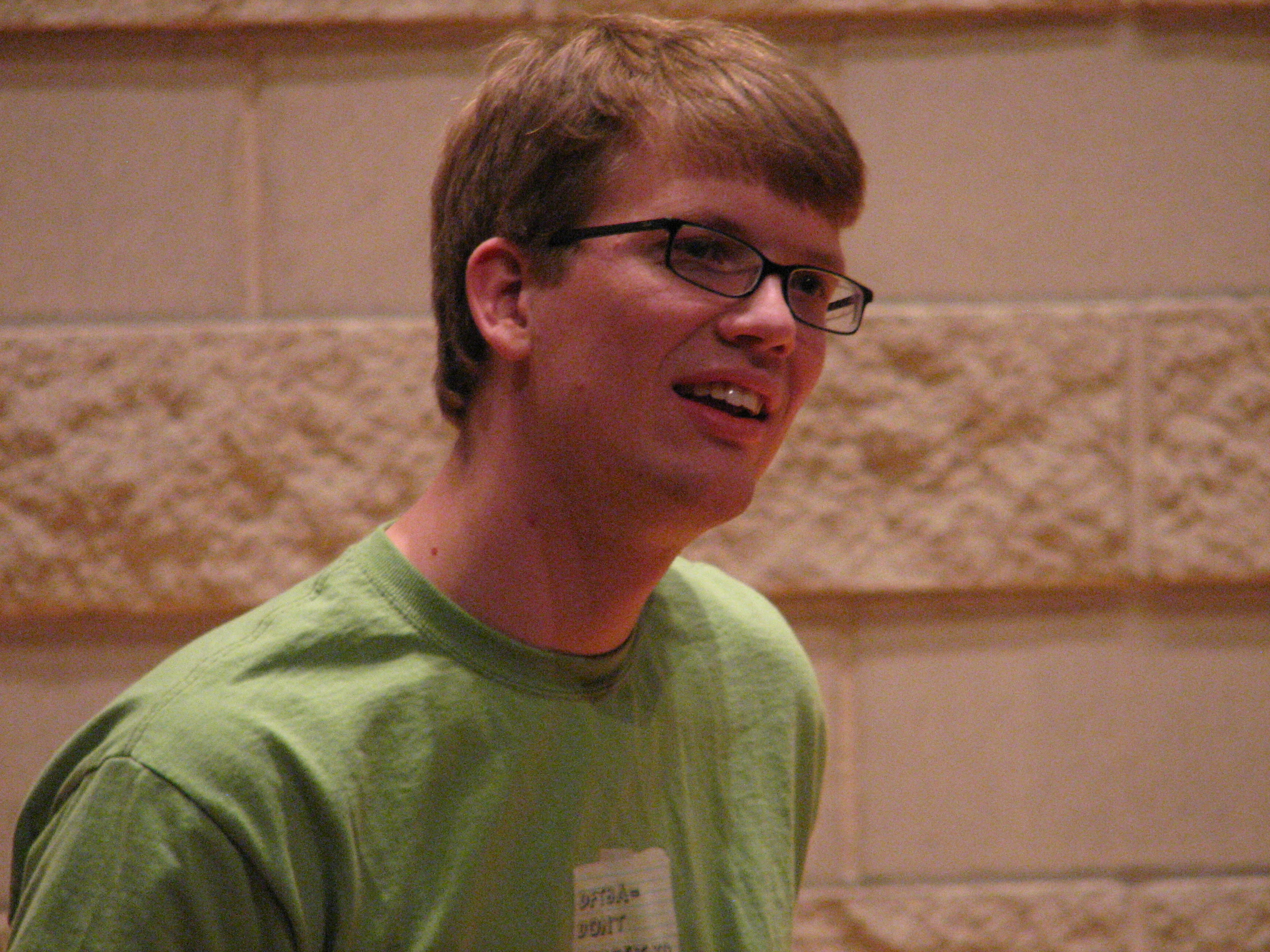
Hank Green in 2008

Both John and Hank have often discussed political and governmental topics in their videos. Hank, in particular, is a strong advocate of young Americans taking advantage of their right to vote. John has also advocated for this, and has written that for years after he turned 18, he did not participate in voting. During this period, John "found politics boring and divisive", believing that politics and voting were a waste of his time. Green adds to this, stating, "I was going to be a writer, and the great writers (I thought) transcend the minor quibbles of their historical moments. Writers focus on the big questions; politics, I thought, is about the small questions." However, as Green matured during his adult years, he has developed a belief that, "the big questions—about our environment, our responsibilities to one another, our rights as citizens—are political questions." In 2016, while speaking on the SourceFed Podcast, Hank expressed that he has become "less liberal".

John has stated that he is an independent voter who has voted for both Republican and Democratic politicians. Additionally, the Greens once created a YouTube channel, registered under the username, obamasidiots. Although, as John stated, "the project went nowhere", the channel was created to raise money for Barack Obama's 2008 presidential campaign.

In 2015, Hank, along with fellow online media personalities, GloZell and Bethany Mota, conducted personal interviews with United States President Barack Obama, following the 2015 State of the Union Address. Though the approach was somewhat different from previous years, having the three conduct interviews continued the White House's efforts to "speak directly to the American people online". Some of the questions Green and his fellow online personalities asked were collected from social media input. CNN's Senior White House correspondent, Jim Acosta was critical of the decision to have Obama be interviewed by the media personalities. Acosta stated, "None of them are professional journalists. They're people who post videos on YouTube", sarcastically adding, "I'm just curious: Was 'Charlie Bit My Finger' or 'David After Dentist' not available?" In response to Acosta, Hank tweeted, "I think sometimes we need to think about how to involve people who are not reached by legacy media in the conversation. That's all." Acosta subsequently replied, "No sense of humor @hankgreen? Totally agree. Good luck." John then defended Hank via a Tumblr post. Coincidentally, John had previously participated in a Fireside Hangout on Google+ with Obama, with the President even reciting the commonly used phrase by Nerdfighters, "Don't forget to be awesome", to conclude one of his answers to John's questions.

=== Gender and sexual orientation ===
Hank and John Green are supporters of LGBT rights. Arguing against those who say homosexuality is unnatural, Hank, who is bisexual himself, states that, "the most natural thing in the world is complexity, and gender, and sexual orientation are proven over and over again to not be firm lines." Hank adds, "To me, there's only one argument that matters for gay marriage: That all people in our country should be seen as equals in the eyes of the law." After receiving high ratings on his vlog centered on same-sex marriage, Hank stated, "It's stuff like that where I feel like we're making the world a better place, and resonating with how people feel about new cultural ideas, and really being a part of the cultural evolution toward a better way of understanding each other and the world."

In 2009, John posted a video, expressing his frustrations with the usage of the word gay as an insult. The word was being used to describe John, despite the fact that it was already known that he was married to a woman. In the video, John stated, "Ultimately, gay will never work as an insult, because it's not bad."

When asked by a Reddit user whether he identifies as a feminist, John Green replying with an anecdote from his childhood, "Yes, I do. My hardcore badass feminist mom told both my brother and me that we were feminists from the time we were like two years old, so if she ever heard me saying I wasn't a feminist she'd fly to my house and smack me upside the head."

== Impact ==
The Green brothers' projects have had varying effects on the YouTube community, nerd culture, young adult fiction, and other fields. One such effect is that of the Green brothers' fanbase, Nerdfighteria, which has been utilized to accomplish charitable actions. Aside from charity, however, several Nerdfighter clubs have been launched as an extracurricular activity at universities such as the University of Maryland and Auburn University. Nerdfighters use the collaborative nature of Nerdfighteria to schedule offline meetups, which on occasion, include the Greens themselves. The New Yorker has described the community as "strikingly civil and constructive for an Internet subculture".

The Greens have also influenced online videos, prompting individuals to create their own vlogs. Additionally, Hank has stated "We really believed in the importance of online video as a cultural form."

Another influence is that of John's novels, which are of the young adult fiction genre. In 2013, A. J. Jacobs of The New York Times reviewed Winger by Andrew Smith. In the review, Jacobs coined the term GreenLit, a play on John's surname, Green and the word literature, to describe "realistic stories told by a funny, self-aware teenage narrator", that include, "sharp dialogue, defective authority figures, occasional boozing, unrequited crushes and one or more heartbreaking twists". The Wall Street Journal also noted "The John Green bump", an effect which includes "a blurb or Twitter endorsement from Mr. Green", that, "can ricochet around the Internet and boost sales". The term has been criticized by Green himself, as he disagrees with the concept that he is singlehandedly responsible for launching any one individual's career, or propelling an individual to success.

Nonetheless, John's novels have been successful, leading him to be included on Time's 2014 "100 Most Influential People" list. Shailene Woodley, who portrayed the main character of The Fault in Our Stars, Hazel Grace Lancaster, in the novel's film adaptation, wrote the piece on Time's list for Green, describing him as a "teen whisperer" and saying, "He acknowledges the intelligence and vulnerability that stem from those beautiful years when we are, for the first time, discovering the world and ourselves outside of our familial stories. But he doesn't just listen to young adults. He treats every human he meets as their own planet, rather than simply one of his moons."

=== Community ===
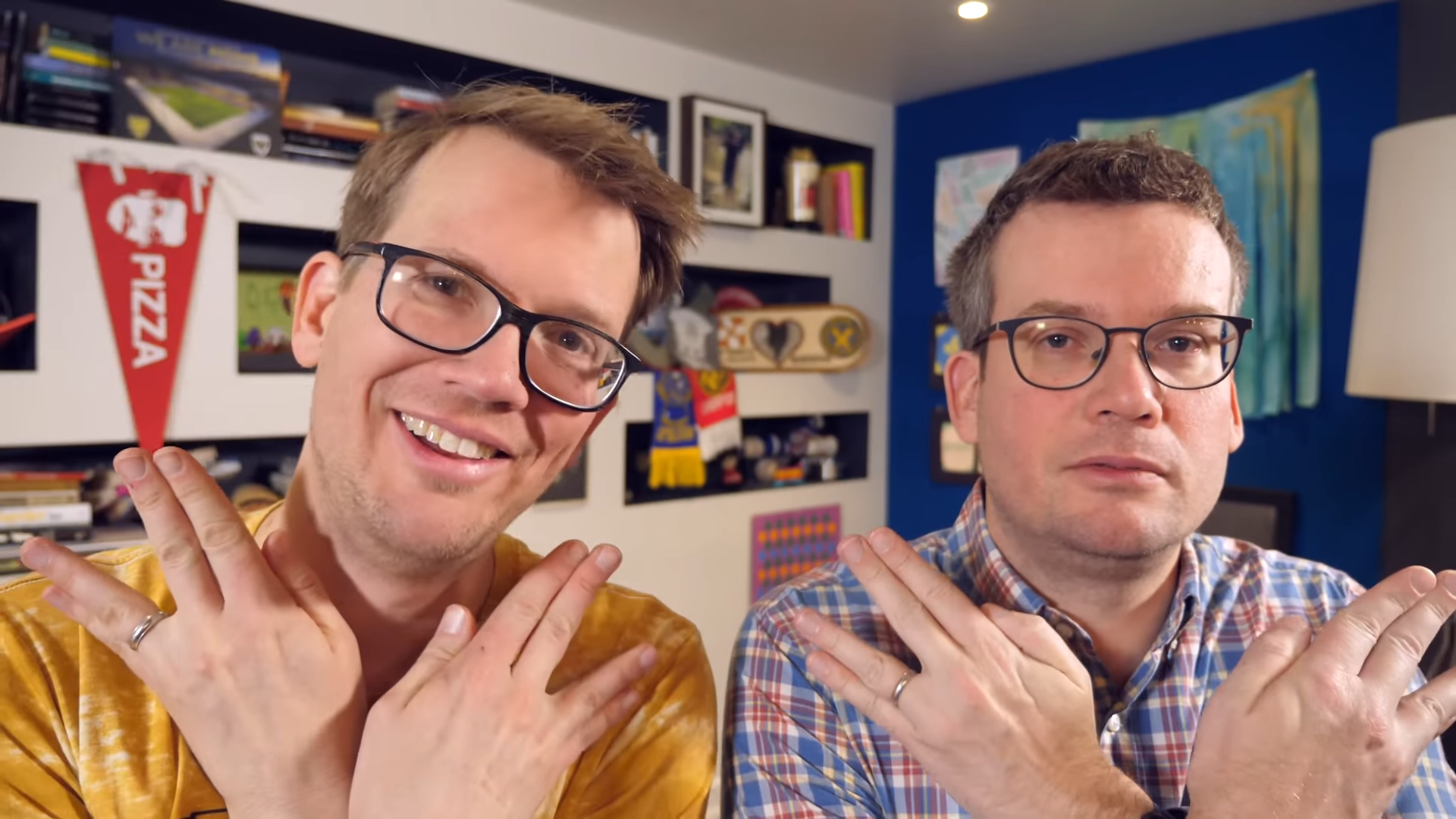
Hank and John performing the Nerdfighter hand sign in 2021

The Green brothers' videos have been able to connect with their viewers, which are individually referred to as "Nerdfighters", and collectively referred to as "Nerdfighteria". Activities, events, and community symbols and terminology have been noted by various media outlets. Nerdfighters have adopted the initialism "DFTBA", standing for "Don't forget to be awesome", as their slogan. The community has also developed a hand sign, which is similar to the Vulcan salute seen in Star Trek. Hank describes the community as "people who are pro-nerd: They fight for nerd culture, to celebrate intellectualism, to find and build spaces on the Internet that are devoted to engagement and meaningful conversation instead of distraction and echo-chambery conversations."

The Greens and Nerdfighters collaborate on various charitable endeavors, which the fanbase refers to as "decreasing" or "fighting world suck". Charitable events conducted by Nerdfighters include the aforementioned Project for Awesome, as well as loaning funds through Kiva.org, to entrepreneurs in developing nations. Additionally, a charity foundation, This Star Won't Go Out (TSWGO), was founded by Wayne and Lori Earl, the parents of Esther Earl.

Esther was an active member of Nerdfighteria, as well as an associated group, the Harry Potter Alliance (HPA), who died of thyroid cancer in 2010. Earl is an influential Nerdfighter, having started the Esther Day celebration, which has been described by HPA founder Andrew Slack, as "the first baggage-free holiday about love and gratitude". Another member of the community, Rosianna Halse Rojas, whom The New Yorker describes as a "pioneering nerdfighter", has the position of being John's personal assistant. However, John describes her as more than a PA, citing that, "she does many things—from project management to helping shape the strategic direction of our educational and charity projects." Daniel Biss, who serves as mayor of Evanston, Illinois, has been referred to by John as, "Brotherhood 2.0's Resident Mathematician", and is also a member of the community. Additionally, Biss designed the mathematics formulas for John's novel, An Abundance of Katherines. Celebrities, including British actor Benedict Cumberbatch, and American rapper Lupe Fiasco, who has compared Crash Course to crack, have also been documented as Nerdfighters.
