= She's the First =

Global organization for empowerment of girls

- Formation: November 1, 2011
- Founded: November 1, 2009
- Type: Nonprofit organization
- Purpose: Girls' education; girls' rights
- Headquarters: New York, New York, US; Nairobi, Kenya
- Location: Manhattan, New York City, New York, U.S.
- Co-Founder: Tammy Tibbetts
- Co-Founder: Christen Brandt
- Website: shesthefirst.org

She's the First (STF) is a non-profit organization whose stated mission is to "team up with grassroots organizations to make sure girls everywhere are educated, respected, and heard." She's the First was founded in New York, New York, by Tammy Tibbetts and Christen Brandt and operates remotely with headquarters in New York, New York, United States and Nairobi, Kenya. The organization's stated vision is "a world where every girl chooses her own future."

In an article published by The Lily, co-founders Tammy Tibbetts and Christen Brandt shared the She's the First philosophy, explaining why She's the First calls itself a non-profit, for-purpose, or NGO (non-governmental organization), as opposed to a charity: "In the cultures and communities where we serve, when you give a girl the opportunity to be the first in her community to go to high school, you're also asking that she be the one to stand up when others question why it should be her. You're asking her to take on the burden of being the oldest, unmarried woman in her family, with all of the stigmas that are often attached to that. You're asking her to become the family's main breadwinner and to navigate how to handle the family's debts and financial challenges. And she steps up."

== History ==
She's the First launched November 1, 2009, as a YouTube video featuring the singer JoJo. The video emphasized the power of girls' education as a solution to global poverty. The organization was registered as a non-profit 501(c)(3) organization in July 2011 and was managed by volunteers until May 2012, when co-founder Tammy Tibbetts was hired as its first employee in the role of CEO.

In 2019, She's the First celebrated the organization's 10th anniversary at an event featuring performances from Sarah Kay (poet), Desi Oakley, Grace Kelly (musician), and remarks from the organization's global ambassador Imaan Hammam.

The organization has collaborated with poet Amanda Gorman, actress Erika Henningsen, actress and producer Elizabeth Banks, United States Soccer Federation She Believes initiative, and the Obama Foundation Girls Opportunity Alliance. Additional noteworthy supporters have included Glamour's The Girl Project, NoVo Foundation, American Express Foundation, and Bobbi Brown Cosmetics, among others.

In each year 2014–2022, members of the Nerdfighteria community have selected She's the First to receive a grant from the Foundation to Decrease World Suck through the organization's Project for Awesome charitable contest, founded by John Green and Hank Green.

== Activities ==
=== Global Girls' Bill of Rights ===
In 2019, She's the First led an effort to create a Global Girls Bill of Rights in collaboration with grassroots organizations and girls across the globe. The bill was presented to Phumzile Mlambo-Ngcuka at the United Nations on International Day of the Girl Child on October 11, 2019.

=== Fundraising ===
In 2017, She's the First retired the Child sponsorship model of fundraising that the organization had employed since its founding. Regarding the shift, co-founder Christen Brandt said, "In the end, human dignity is the most important consideration. If you are committed to eradicating systems of inequity, a sponsorship model actually undermines the ground you stand on. Sponsorship models are based on the very power dynamics we wanted to change."

=== STF Summit ===
Since 2012, She's the First has hosted an annual leadership conference called the STF Summit for members of the organization's campus chapter network. STF Summit speakers have included Awkwafina, Jessica Bennett (journalist), Blair Imani, Ann Shoket, Amani al-Khatahtbeh, Jamia Wilson, Jamira Burley, and others.

== Awards ==
- 2015 Outstanding Philanthropic Organization awarded by the Association of Fundraising Professionals NYC Chapter
- 2013 Organization's Commitment to Action recognized on stage by Chelsea Clinton at the annual CGIU Conference
- DVF Awards People's Voice Award, presented to Tammy Tibbetts
- 2012 Seventeen Magazine "Pretty Amazing" cover contest winner Lindsay Brown, recognized for her role as President of the She's the First campus chapter at the University of Notre Dame
