= P4A =

P4A may refer to:

- Persona 4 Arena, a 2012 fighting video game
- Project for Awesome, a community-driven charitable movement on YouTube
- P4A-TV, TV station in Aruba, Dutch Antilles
