= Esther Earl =

American author and online personality (1994–2010)

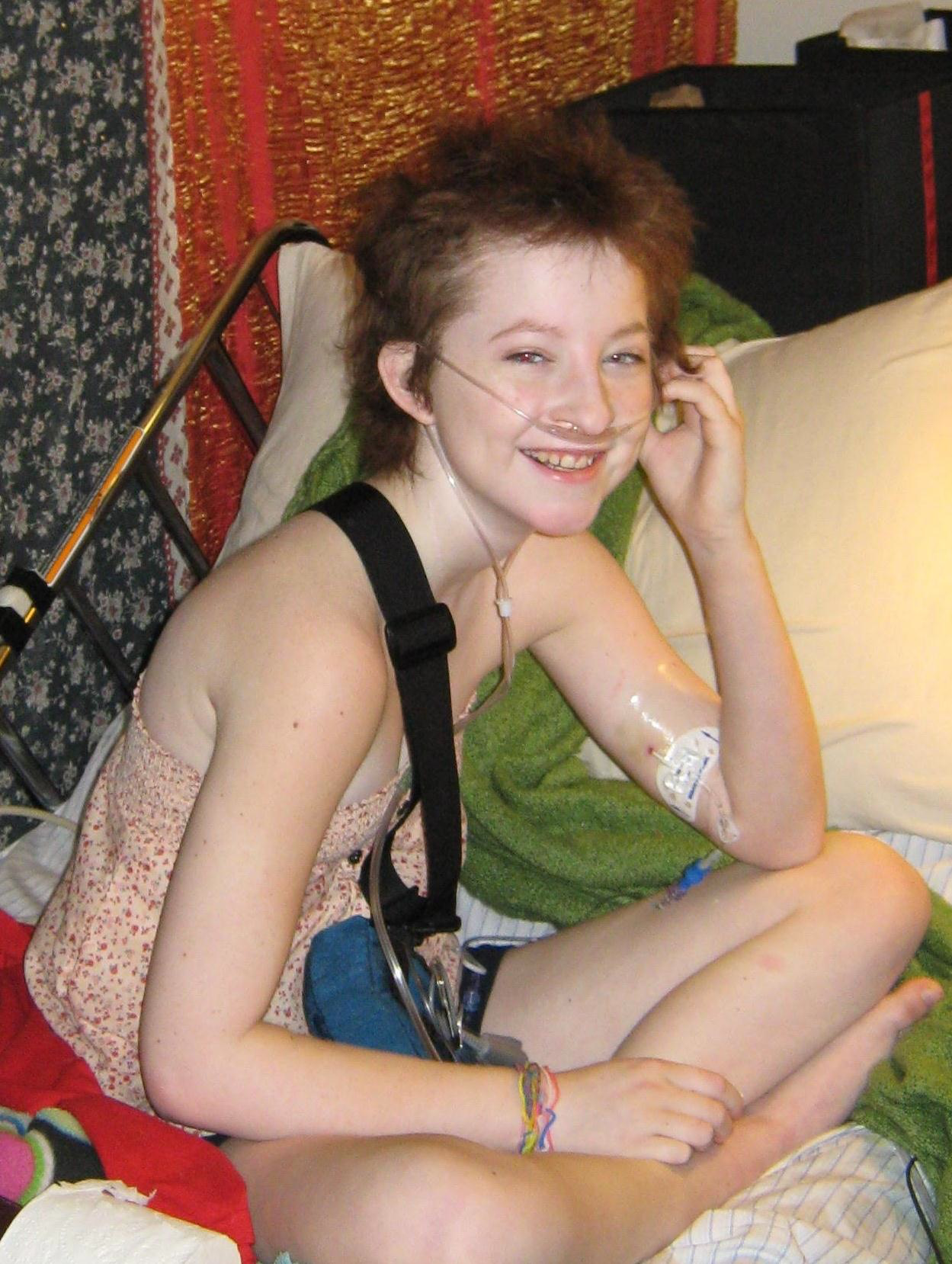
- Earl in 2008
- Born: Esther Grace Earl; August 3, 1994; Beverly, Massachusetts, U.S.
- Died: August 25, 2010 (aged 16); Boston, Massachusetts, U.S.
- Cause of death: Thyroid cancer
- Resting place: Oakland Cemetery, Medway, Massachusetts
- Occupations: Nerdfighter; online personality; author; internet vlogger
- Notable work: This Star Won't Go Out (foundation; book)

Esther Grace Earl (August 3, 1994 – August 25, 2010) was an American author, internet vlogger, online personality, and Nerdfighter, as well as an activist in the Harry Potter Alliance. Prior to her death from cancer in 2010, Earl befriended author John Green, who credited her for the inspiration to complete his bestselling 2012 novel The Fault in Our Stars. In 2014, Earl's writings were compiled with her biography This Star Won't Go Out, which appeared on the New York Times bestseller list for young adult books. Earl has been cited as an influential activist, with her family and online followers continuing to hold charity and fundraising events in her memory.

== Early life and activism ==
Earl was born in Beverly, Massachusetts, to Wayne and Lori Earl (née Krake), one of five siblings. The Earls, whom The Boston Globe characterizes as "self-described wanderers", moved between Saudi Arabia, Massachusetts, and France. While in Massachusetts, she resided in Medway before moving with her family to North Quincy and attending North Quincy High School.

In 2007, Earl met John Green, and Margaret Talbot of The New Yorker states she, "was one of the earliest nerdfighters." Initially the two maintained an online friendship, which grew from her self-identification as a Nerdfighter, a member of Nerdfighteria, the online community of Vlogbrothers fans. Earl developed her friendship with Green upon meeting him at LeakyCon 2009, a Harry Potter conference. Following the conference, she would continue in the Nerdfighter community, including her involvement with the Harry Potter Alliance (HPA) and their winning of a $250,000 grant, after Green encouraged voters to vote "with Esther" for the HPA.

Earl built an online presence on platforms such as Twitter, Tumblr, and YouTube.

== Cancer and death ==
At the age of 12 in November 2006 in Marseille, Earl was diagnosed with metastasized papillary thyroid cancer. The following Thanksgiving in 2007, her parents sought a second opinion at Boston Children's Hospital. Earl's doctors informed her and her parents that her cancer was terminal.

She continued her online community activities until her death due to thyroid cancer on August 25, 2010. John Green, saddened by Earl's death, dedicated a eulogy in vlog format titled, Rest in Awesome, Esther. Earl's YouTube videos remained available for streaming following her death.

== Legacy ==
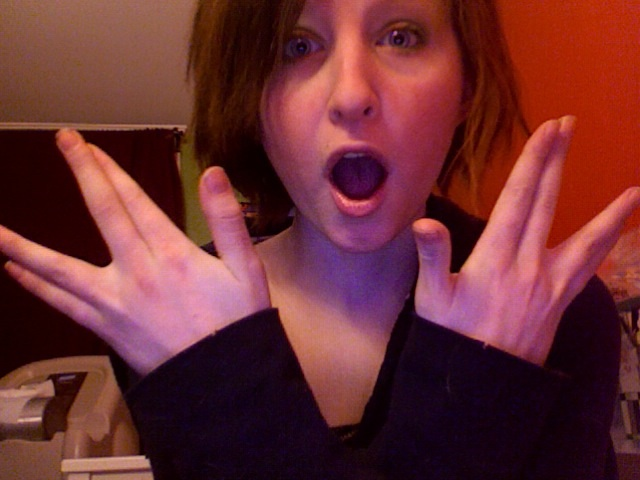
Esther Earl doing the "Nerdfighter salute"

Following her death, Earl inspired communities she participated in such as Nerdfighteria and the Harry Potter Alliance. She inspired two books, "Esther Day", as well as the founding of a nonprofit organization. In 2014, after the release of the film adaptation of The Fault in Our Stars and Esther's novel, Esther's parents spoke at Wallace State Community College and the Dana–Farber Cancer Institute about the legacy that Esther left behind. In 2015, Alba, a Quincy restaurant, held a Summer Gala fundraising event in her honor.

=== Esther Day ===
Shortly before her death, John Green uploaded I Love Hank: Esther Day 2010. The video was uploaded in celebration of "Esther Day", a day which Earl stated she wanted to be about "family and love." Esther Day is celebrated annually on August 3, Esther's birthday. Green has stated Earl was the one to suggest "the idea of celebrating friends and family and love," specifically, "the kinds of love that are too often overlooked in our culture: love among friends and family." In 2014, bookstores around the United States celebrated Esther Day. Additionally, Green has called Esther Day, "the most important holiday in Nerdfighteria."

=== This Star Won't Go Out ===
Esther means "star," and her friends had a bracelet printed out that reads This star won't go out, and it won't. We won't let it.

— John Green, 2010

Following her death, Earl's parents, Wayne and Lori founded This Star Won't Go Out, a non-profit organization which helps families that have cancer-stricken children. To assist the organization, the VlogBrothers donate proceeds from TSWGO merchandise sold on DFTBA.com.

Earl's biography, co-authored by her parents, was posthumously published under the title This Star Won't Go Out: The Life and Words of Esther Grace Earl. Green wrote the introduction. The book was inspired by a promise between Earl and her father: whoever outlived the other would write about the other. The book includes a collection of her journals and drawings.

=== The Fault in Our Stars ===
Esther Earl inspired the character Hazel Grace Lancaster in Green's 2012 novel The Fault in Our Stars as well as its 2014 film adaptation. Shailene Woodley portrayed Lancaster in the novel's film adaptation. Although Earl inspired the novel and the character of Hazel Grace, the novel is not intended to be biographical. Green dedicated the novel to Esther but also found inspiration through others, including his son and wife, as well as his experience as a children's hospital chaplain. Green wrote on his Tumblr blog, "I don't want people conflating Esther with Hazel (they're very different), and it's extremely important to me that I not claim to be telling Esther's story."
