= Rosianna Halse Rojas =

British YouTuber and writer (born 1991)

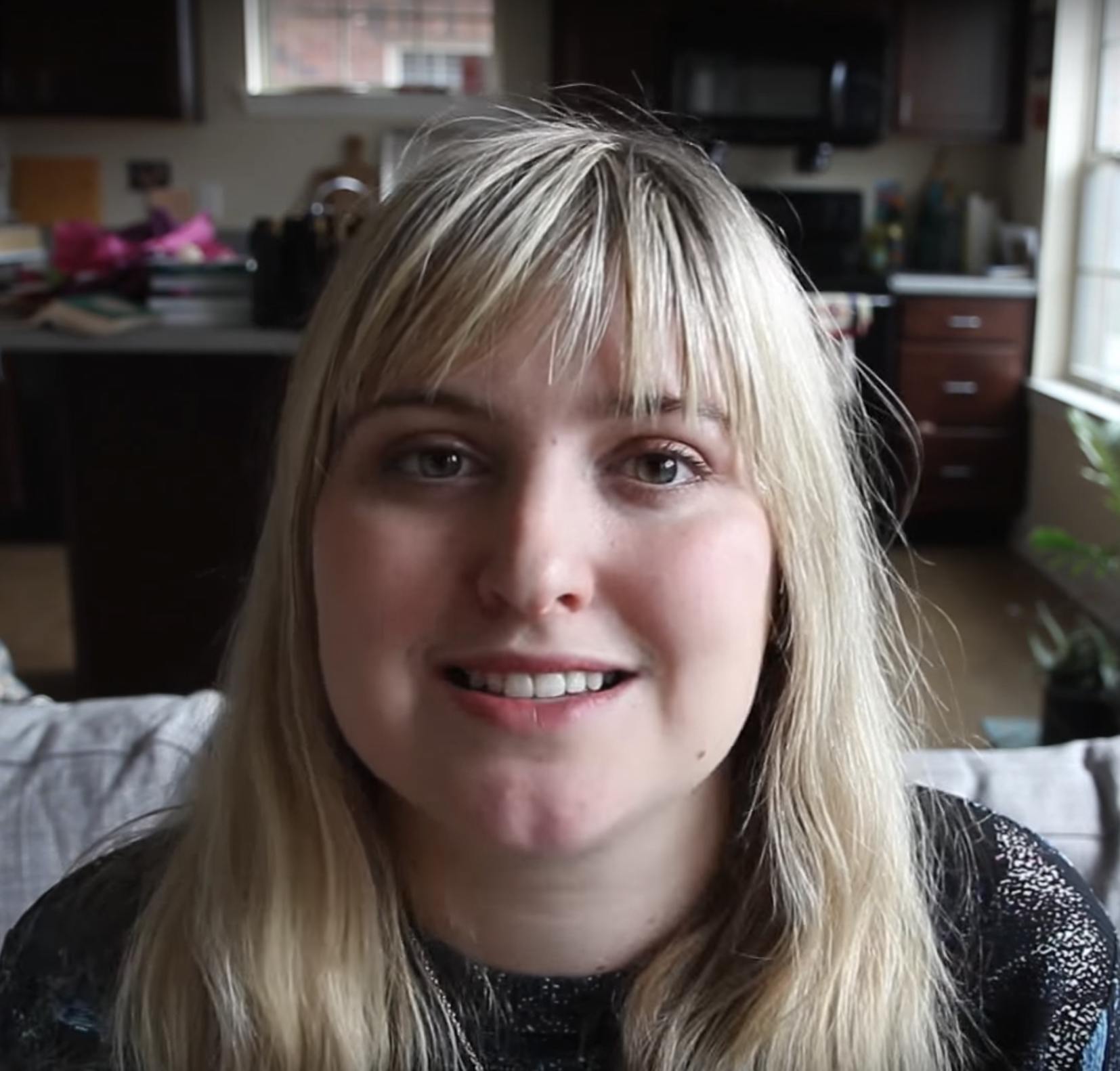
- Rojas in a 2016 Vlogbrothers video
- Born: 15 August 1991 (age 35); England
- Education: University of Exeter (BA); SOAS University of London (MSc)
- Years active: 2006–present

YouTube information
- Channel: Rosianna Halse Rojas
- Genre: Vlog
- Subscribers: 57.7 thousand
- Views: 1.19 million
- Last updated: 30 August 2024

Rosianna Halse Rojas (born 15 August 1991) is a British writer, video blogger, social media manager, and online personality. She is best known for working with vlogger and novelist John Green, initially as his personal assistant, later producing partner.

Regarding her work with Green, Rojas has stated, "The job is varied – books, online video, podcasts, film and television projects, our work with Partners in Health [in] Sierra Leone, a book club – but overall what I’m most passionate about is that every person I work with understands and is enthusiastic about the potential of community to effect change."

== Early life and education ==
From London, Rojas was born to an English father and a Mexican mother. She attended Tiffin Girls' School before going on to study English at the University of Exeter. During her second year, she studied abroad at Vassar College. She would later pursue a Master of Science in Migration, Mobility and Development at SOAS University of London, completing her dissertation in 2022.

== Projects ==
=== YouTube ===
Rojas first created a YouTube channel in 2006, when she registered her account under the username missxrojas. On the account, she would post vlogs about Harry Potter, intellectualism and her personal school life as she studied for GCSE and A Level exams, among other topics. Her videos attracted an audience, and she developed a presence in the Nerdfighteria community. Eventually, in March 2013, Halse Rojas became John Green's personal executive assistant. John Green, along with Hank Green, comprise the VlogBrothers, a vlogging channel from which the Nerdfighteria community was created. She also gave a TED talk at TEDx Brighton. She was one of 16 vloggers recognised by YouTube's Next program in 2012.

Rojas has been described as "a pioneering nerdfighter," by The New Yorker. In 2013, Rojas was one of six fill-in hosts for Green on the VlogBrothers channel, while Green was on paternity leave. Rojas has also served as the editorial director of Leaky News, a Harry Potter fansite.

Aside from being involved in Nerdfighteria, Rojas is a personality in YouTube's female community; she identifies as a feminist. She moderated the Sexism on YouTube panel at VidCon 2014. In this field, Rojas has also designed "The Ladies Survey", an online survey about women and the internet. She is also credited with being a writer on the humanities-related courses (world history, literature, US history) on Crash Course.

In 2017, Rojas was named a Creators for Change ambassador by YouTube.

=== Life's Library ===
In 2018, Rojas founded the Life's Library book club with John Green. Members of the book club read a book approximately every 6 weeks, with online discussion occurring on the Life's Library Discord. Rojas and Green alternated choosing books, with guest curators occasionally making selections. Regarding Life's Library, Rojas has stated:

After the first year we’ve seen a brilliant and engaged community on the Discord, with thoughtful discussions about each of the titles and an excitement and curiosity about finding out more about the text, authors, and similar books. It’s such a positive space on the internet and I feel very lucky to be a small part of it.

Life's Library was free to participate in, with paid subscription options available to receive digital or physical subscriptions, containing additional materials such as a discussion podcast, or a version of the book itself. All profits from Life's Library were donated to Partners in Health Sierra Leone to help reduce maternal mortality. The book club ended in March 2022.

=== Podcasts ===
Rojas hosted a relationships advice podcast titled Make Out With Him with her friend Lex Croucher, self-described as "a crushes, dating, friendships and kissing podcast." It is currently on hiatus.

Rojas also produces the podcasts The Anthropocene Reviewed and Dear Hank & John, both being co-productions of Complexly and WNYC Studios. She featured as a guest host in the episode It's My Soundtrack! when Hank Green was absent.

Rojas has also been a guest on three episodes of the popular Harry Potter podcast Potterless.

=== Film production ===
After signing a first-look producing deal with Fox 2000 and Temple Hill Entertainment, Green hired Rojas as a producing partner. Their currently unnamed production company is working with Fox 2000 to produce a film about AFC Wimbledon, a third-tier English soccer team.

Rojas was an executive producer on the Turtles All the Way Down film alongside Green.
