= Fandom Forward =

Nonprofit organization

- Founded: 2005
- Founder: Andrew Slack, Paul DeGeorge, Seth Soulstein
- Dissolved: 2024
- Type: Charity
- Purpose: Human rights, education, literacy
- Location: Binghamton, New York, U.S.
- Website: Archived website
- Formerly called: The Harry Potter Alliance

Fandom Forward, named The Harry Potter Alliance until 2021, was a nonprofit organization that was initially run by Harry Potter fans but subsequently expanded to include members of various fandoms. It was founded in 2005 to draw attention to human rights violations in Sudan. Since then, the organization's campaigns have focused on topics such as literacy, United States immigration reform, economic justice, LGBT rights, sexism, labor rights, mental health, body image, and climate change. They have received recognition from many popular figures in the Harry Potter community and have been the subject of multiple academic studies on fan activism and civic engagement among youth.

== History ==
=== 2005–2008 ===
Fandom Forward was founded in 2005 as The Harry Potter Alliance by comedian Andrew Slack and the wizard rock band Harry and the Potters, initially collecting donations for Amnesty International at their shows. In 2006, the organization partnered with Walmart Watch to create a series of YouTube videos about the "Dark Lord Waldemart" in order to educate fans about Walmart's labour practices. The three videos have been viewed nearly three and a half million times total.

In 2007, Fandom Forward broadcast a special edition of PotterCast, a popular fandom podcast, called "Becoming Dumbledore's Army: Harry Potter Fans for Darfur", to educate fans about genocide in Darfur. They partnered with STAND, a student branch of the Genocide Intervention Network, and asked members to participate in the annual STANDFast project by giving up one luxury for a week and donating the money they saved to STAND to benefit civilians in Darfur. The effort raised $15,000 for STAND. They also joined the 24 Hours for Darfur project, which sought to make a 24-hour video of individuals speaking out against the genocide in Darfur, by asking members to submit videos as fans. When CNN.com's asked for submissions of fans showing their love for Harry Potter to their iReport site, Fandom Forward asked members to upload submissions showing their love for Harry Potter while holding signs that said, "Save Darfur." Then, in 2008, Fandom Forward asked members to withhold support for sponsors of the 2008 Summer Olympics who were "implicitly funding the genocide in Darfur through overseas investments."

=== 2009–2011 ===
In conjunction with the release of the Harry Potter and the Half-Blood Prince film in 2009, the organization launched a "What Would Dumbledore Do" campaign, asking fans to tweet about the lessons they learned from Harry Potter's headmaster Albus Dumbledore using #dumbledore, attend the film release wearing a nametag with one thing Dumbledore taught them, and apply those lessons in their lives.

Fandom Forward also began its now-annual Accio Books! campaign in 2009, collecting over 13,000 books for their partner Agohozo Shalom Youth Village in Rwanda. Since then, the annual drive has collected over 86,000 books, benefiting The Delta Center for Culture and Learning who distributed the books to communities in need across the Mississippi Delta, the Imagine Better library at Bedford-Stuvyesant New Beginnings Charter School, Read Indeed, Books For Kids, and other local organizations. Since 2013, they have partnered with the International Quidditch Association and NaNoWriMo for the campaign.

After the 2010 earthquake in Haiti, Fandom Forward partnered with Partners In Health and other fan communities to create Helping Heal Haiti. With the help of partners, the Wizard Rock community, Maureen Johnson, John and Hank Green, Fandom Forward auctioned over 100 items including the Harry Potter books. In two weeks, Fandom Forward raised over $123,000 for Partners in Health In Haiti. The money raised helped Partners in Health charter five planes to Haiti full of medical supplies. The planes were named after characters in the Harry Potter series and DFTBA ("Don't Forget To Be Awesome") in honor of the Nerdfighter community.

In June 2010, Fandom Forward competed against 10,000 other charitable organizations to win a grant from the Chase Community Giving Contest on Facebook. They received 38,689 votes to win the first place grant of $250,000. The money received from this grant went towards expanding their reach and improving their literacy and LGBT rights programs.

In June 2010, Fandom Forward and Savetheinternet.com joined to campaign for net neutrality. They launched a viral video consisting of many well-known figures speaking out for the cause, several of the people who took part were John and Hank Green, Wil Wheaton, Maureen Johnson and Adam Savage. In this video they all urged the Federal Communications Commission to preserve net neutrality.

In the months leading up to the final Harry Potter film release, Harry Potter and the Deathly Hallows – Part 2, Fandom Forward launched their Deathly Hallows campaign. Each month, the organization highlighted a different "horcrux", or injustice, for members to work to end. The first horcrux, "Starvation Wages", focused on inhumane working conditions in the chocolate industry and asked that the Harry Potter themed chocolate frogs made by Warner Brothers be fair-trade certified. This later developed into Fandom Forward's currently on-going "Not in Harry's Name" campaign. According to their website, an independent report gave Harry Potter chocolate an "F" in human rights. Executive director Andrew Slack personally reached out to Warner Bros. CEO Barry M. Meyer about Fandom Forward's concerns, and Meyer responded with comments about their commitment to ethical sourcing. Slack reached out again to discuss ways to ensure the ethical sourcing of Potter chocolate, but he was met with the comment that they are satisfied with the practices of the company they are using to source the chocolate. On January 13, 2015, the Washington Post reported that Warner Bros. had committed to ensuring by the end of 2015 that "'all Harry Potter chocolate products sold at Warner Bros. outlets and through our licensed partners will be 100-percent UTZ or Fair Trade certified.'"

During the Deathly Hallows campaign, Fandom Forward also partnered with ReachOut.com to fight the effects of depression and the "dementor horcrux", challenged harmful body image, incorporated an Accio Books! book drive, teamed up with Marriage Equality Rhode Island and the Gay-Straight Alliance on marriage equality and bullying, and worked with Splashlife to address climate crises.

=== 2012–2015 ===
On July 31, 2012, staff member Julian Gomez posted a video to the organization's YouTube channel explaining that he was an undocumented immigrant. The organization partnered with Define American and later launched their "Superman Is an Immigrant" campaign, inviting members to tell their families' immigration stories and change the conversation about immigration reform.

Later that year, Fandom Forward ran a fundraiser entitled Equality for the Win, or Equality FTW, on Indiegogo raising a total of $94,803 from 2,289 donors across the globe for their equality-related initiatives. They nearly doubled their goal of $50,000. Donors gave money in exchange for exclusive perks from people such as John and Hank Green, Potter Puppet Pals, Evanna Lynch, LeakyCon, StarKid and more. They have repeated the fundraiser each fall since, raising over $180,000 in 2013 and over $150,000 in 2014.

At the LeakyCon held in London in 2013, Fandom Forward created the Apparating Library, a program where attendees donate one book to the library and receive a voucher to come back another day during the convention to redeem their voucher for a different book. The library has since been present at other large fan events, such as LeakyCon and VidCon. In 2014 as part of their annual Accio Books campaign, they created an Apparating Library in Detroit, Michigan, to distribute books donated through the campaign.

With the release of The Hunger Games: Catching Fire (2013), The Hunger Games: Mockingjay Part 1 (2014), and The Hunger Games: Mockingjay Part 2 (2015) Fandom Forward launched their on-going Odds In Our Favor campaign, focused on economic justice. The campaign encouraged fans to hijack Lionsgate's social media marketing with three-finger salutes and discussion of real-world economic inequality. Wired described the tactics as "culture jamming". During the campaign they partnered with groups such as AFL-CIO, Oxfam, Fight for $15, Project UROK, Campaign for Youth Justice, and many more.

=== 2016–2018 ===
In 2016, Fandom Forward launched "Protego", using the powerful shield spell as the name of a campaign dedicated to helping transgender people become empowered and providing resources for everyone to create safe spaces for transgender people. Wizard activists completed 1,225 actions to support the trans community and Fandom Forward partnered with the National Center for Transgender Equality to support legislative advocacy campaigns in six U.S. states and Canada. Wizard activists spoke up to get gender neutral bathrooms and language established in their favorite public spaces.

The 'Wizard Rock the Vote 2016' campaign helped Fandom Forward assisted in registering hundreds of new voters. Chapters of Fandom Forward banded together to do everything from holding mock votes at schools to raise voter awareness to starting an education campaign to show young people how they can influence the political process without being able to vote.

In December 2016, Fandom Forward launched Neville Fights Back, a movement dedicated to resisting bigotry and hate in communities. The campaign encouraged individuals to stand up and defend what they believed in from education, to immigration, to healthcare, to saving library funding, while also encouraging people to stay informed about what was going on in their communities.

Following the Neville Fights Back campaign, Fandom Forward encouraged people to fight back against hatred and stand up for immigrants with Dumbledore's Army Fights Back. In 2018, the Fandom Forward partnered with the ACLU, Define American, the Northwest Community Center in Dallas, and more to raise thousands of dollars for legal aid for immigrants. Fans publicly recognized native land, created plans to vote, wrote welcome letters to newly resettled refugees, made calls to the government to protect immigrants, and held a Wizard Rock show to #ReuniteEveryChild. In 2019 Fandom Forward partnered with RAICES to host a series of actions to defend and support immigrants, including hosting and attending multiple protests to #CloseTheCamps, a letter to the editor campaign, and creating an open source database for wizard activists to find immigrant-serving organizations to volunteer with locally.

In Fall 2017, Fandom Forward began "A World Without Hermione", a campaign dedicated to making sure more girls have access to education and opportunities to change the world. Fandom Forward partnered with She's the First and kicked off the campaign with an unusual Hogwarts letter to prompt conversations about why making sure every girl can go to school and be a leader is important. During the campaign Fandom Forward fundraised for scholarships for STF scholars, and helped to raise $43,045, donating enough for She's the First to support eight girls in attending school, working with a mentor, and graduating.

Fandom Forward also started Wizard Activist School, a free, self-paced, online school for new and experienced activists to hone their organizing skills. Through Wizard Activist School, Fandom Forward has trained over 700 new activists.

=== 2019–2024 ===
On June 8, 2021, partly in response to Rowling's remarks critical of transgender people, the Harry Potter Alliance changed its name to Fandom Forward. The change also aimed to reflect its community better, because it also included fans of non-Harry Potter media.

On December 5, 2024, Fandom Forward announced that the board and senior staff decided to close the organization.

== International chapters ==
Fandom Forward had chapters in more than 30 countries around the world on six different continents. Chapters were autonomous and used the resources of Fandom Forward to work on the projects they felt were most needed by their communities. Fandom Forward also had individual members who were not associated with a chapter on six different continents.

Through the Accio Books campaign, Fandom Forward helped to build or stock libraries in the United States, Rwanda, Uganda, the Netherlands, and England.

== Granger Leadership Academy ==
Started in 2014, the Granger Leadership Academy was a unique annual leadership conference for fan activists. Fans and progressive organizers came together for four days to engage in Fandom Forward's "Narrative Leadership Model", a model where attendees learned real world community organizing skills through a series of workshops and keynotes that followed the Hero's Journey.

Time at the conference always concluded with attendees partnering with local and national organizations for a series of actions to create real change. Past GLA action partners have included Sunrise, the American Library Association, Borderlinks, Raise the Age Missouri, and more.

The GLA has been hosted in Auburn, AL (2014), Warwick, RI (2016), St. Louis, MO (2017), Tucson, AZ (2018), and Philadelphia, PA (2019). In 2020, GLA was hosted virtually for the first time and trained 340 wizard activists.

== Funding ==
Fandom Forward was funded primarily by private donations from members around the world. In 2012, Fandom Forward ran a fundraiser entitled Equality for the Win, or Equality FTW, on Indiegogo raising a total of $94,803 from 2,289 donors across the globe for their equality-related initiatives. They nearly doubled their goal of $50,000. Donors gave money in exchange for exclusive perks from people such as John and Hank Green, Potter Puppet Pals, Evanna Lynch, LeakyCon, StarKid and more. They have repeated the fundraiser each fall since.

Fandom Forward was also a frequent grant winner from the Project4Awesome. The Granger Leadership Academy was sponsored by ActBlue, Mischief Management, the Ford Foundation, the American Library Association, and more.

== Reception ==
Fandom Forward received significant support from the Vlogbrothers and John and Hank Green. Fandom Forward was a frequent favorite for donations from the annual Project for Awesome.

Emerson Spartz, founder of MuggleNet, embraced Fandom Forward. "As readers we get very emotional when werewolves and house elves are being discriminated against," he described. Fandom Forward "shows how those feelings can relate to real problems that we can solve."

Researcher Henry Jenkins said, "[Fandom Forward] has created a new form of civic engagement which allows participants to reconcile their activist identities with the pleasurable fantasies that brought the fan community together in the first place."

== See also ==
- Harry Potter fandom
- Star Wars: Force for Change
