= Tammy Tibbetts =

American non-profit organization founder (born c. 1985)

Tammy Tibbetts (born c. 1985), is co-founder and CEO of the non-profit organization She's the First. She is the co-author of Impact: A Step-by-Step Plan to Create the World You Want to Live In (Public Affairs, 2020) with Christen Brandt.

Raised in South Brunswick, New Jersey, Tibbetts graduated from South Brunswick High School in 2003 before attending The College of New Jersey.

== She's the First ==
Tibbetts co-founded the non-profit She's the First in 2009. She's the First fights gender inequality through education by supporting girls who are the first in their family to graduate high school and by training students everywhere to be global citizens.

She's the First has more than 225 chapters in high schools and colleges across the US and in 10 countries.

== Recognition ==
Marie Claire considered Tibbetts one of the "20 Women Who Are Changing Your World" in 2014.

Tibbetts was also one of Glamour's 20 Young Women Who Are Already Changing the World in 2011.
