= Vlogbrothers =

YouTube video blog channel

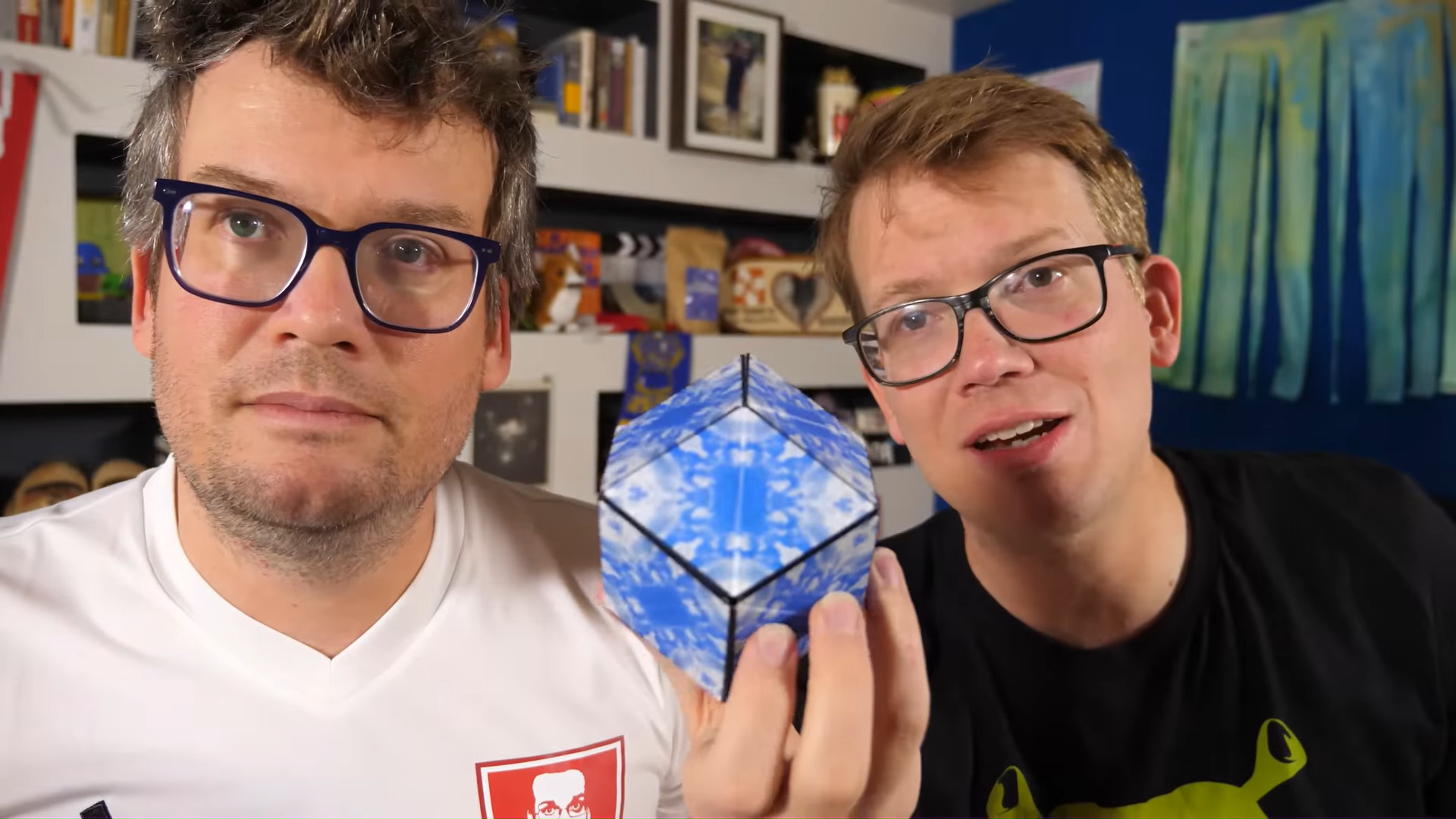
- John (left) and Hank (right), 2022

YouTube information
- Channel: vlogbrothers
- Years active: 2007–present
- Genre: Vlogging
- Subscribers: 4.09 million
- Views: 1.1 billion
- Last updated: September 30, 2026

Vlogbrothers (sometimes stylized as VlogBrothers or vlogbrothers) is a video blog channel on YouTube. The Internet-based show is created and hosted by the Green brothers: John and Hank. The first incarnation of the brothers' online broadcasting was the "Brotherhood 2.0" project, preceding the establishment of the pair's regular vlogging activity through the Vlogbrothers channel.

The Vlogbrothers channel was the first in what would become a larger portfolio of YouTube channels created and developed by the Greens, sparking a community of fans and supporters of Vlogbrothers, known individually as Nerdfighters, and collectively as Nerdfighteria. Subscribers of the brothers on YouTube are the base of the online community Nerdfighteria. The Green brothers encourage their viewers to become a community by creating websites and various projects, like the Project for Awesome, as a way to engage with their subscribers.

Vlogbrothers is owned by Complexly (formerly named EcoGeek LLC), which was originally solely owned by Hank, but was later jointly owned by both Greens. In February 2026, the Greens made Complexly a 501(c)(3) nonprofit organization, relinquishing their ownership.

== Format and schedule ==
The Greens state that their vlog has no consistent format: "Really, it's not about anything in particular. Whether we're talking about our lives, making each other laugh, or trying to get something more important across, people seem to enjoy it." The channel passed one million subscribers on March 5, 2013. As of 2024, the brothers post two videos per week onto their Vlogbrothers channel, with John posting his videos on Tuesday, and Hank posting on Friday.

== Brotherhood 2.0 project ==
The Green brothers, inspired by the show with zefrank, devised the Brotherhood 2.0 project late in 2006. The project was launched on January 1, 2007, based on the premise that the brothers would cease all text-based communication for one year and, instead, converse by video blogs every weekday. The project was made available to the public on YouTube, with John's first video on his original channel "sparksflyup," as well as through the brothers' own Brotherhood 2.0 website. On July 18, 2007, Hank Green uploaded a video of himself performing his song "Accio Deathly Hallows" in honor of the seventh Harry Potter book. This video was the first Vlogbrothers video to make the front page of YouTube, and the starting point of the brothers' success as vloggers. Toward the end of 2007, the brothers launched the first Project For Awesome campaign, in which YouTubers created innovative videos promoting their favorite charity, with the aim that their promoted charity gains more awareness, and donations from viewers. The Brotherhood 2.0 Project ended on December 31, 2007. However, the brothers decided to continue uploading videos on YouTube due to their popularity and growing fan base.

== Post-Brotherhood 2.0 ==
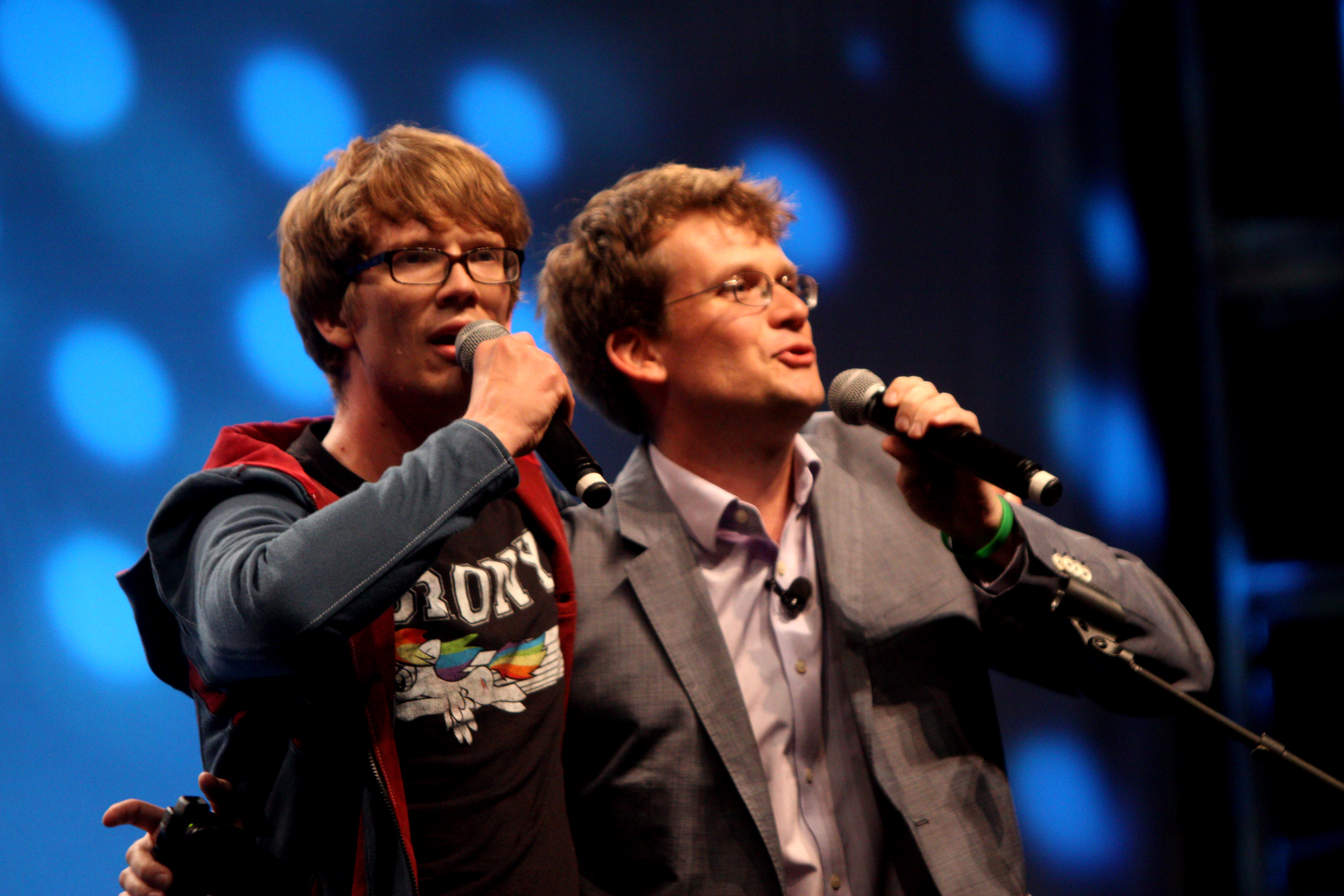
Hank and John at VidCon 2012

In their December 31, 2007 video, the brothers revealed their decision to continue vlogging even though the project had ended. Following the conclusion of Brotherhood 2.0, a website was set up for their community, known as Nerdfighters. The website was originally maintained solely by Hank Green, but was later updated and moderated by a group of community volunteers known as the "Ningmasters". New projects, videos, discussions, groups and forums entirely made by the Vlogbrothers fan community were uploaded daily. The brothers' videos continue to be the basis of the online community known as "Nerdfighteria".

Continuing the trend of their previous charitable endeavors, the Greens rallied their viewers to make micro-donations on Kiva.org. The Nerdfighters lending team was launched in September 2008. As of November 6, the Kiva Nerdfighters group ranks fifth on the site for total money loaned through total domestic and international microloans. It has roughly 51,000 members who have loaned a collective total of over $17.9 million.

On January 20, 2010, John Green went on paternity leave, and Maureen Johnson made videos in his place until his return the following month, when he introduced his son, Henry.

Hank Green was interviewed by Forbes in May 2011. During 2011 and 2012, the Green brothers had their Vlogbrothers videos consistently featured on media outlets such as CBS News and Huffington Post. On September 14, 2012, Hank Green made a video celebrating the 1000th video on the Vlogbrothers channel that commemorated the brothers' experiences over the previous 5 years.

=== One million subscribers and ten years on YouTube (2013–2023) ===
A Vlogbrothers video featuring both John and Hank

On January 15, 2013, they featured in "An Evening of Awesome at Carnegie Hall" celebrating the anniversary of John's novel The Fault in Our Stars. The two-hour live streamed event also featured The Mountain Goats, Kimya Dawson, and Neil Gaiman. In February, John Green participated in a Google+ Hangout with Barack Obama during which John's wife, Sarah Urist Green, also appeared. Prior to this, she had not been seen on camera or in any of his blogs, preferring not to join her husband on camera. Her elusive attitude gained her the nickname "The Yeti". On March 5, the channel hit 1 million subscribers and both brothers live-tweeted the occasion.

Later, on June 25, John Green went on paternity leave for the birth of his second child, Alice, and six guest hosts made videos in his place, including Hannah Hart (MyHarto), Grace Helbig (itsgrace), Craig Benzine (wheezywaiter), Rosianna Rojas (missxrojas), and the winners of the "Nerd Factor" competition: YouTube users MagicTurtle643 and Sabrina Cruz (NerdyAndQuirky). In November, John created a video discussing bullying in general, as well as his personal experience with getting bullied.

Starting in 2012 and 2013, John and Hank launched an event called "Pizzamas" in which they sold merchandise of a white outlined image of John sporting a thick mustache, originating from a 2009 Vlogbrothers video that then became a popular meme in the Nerdfighteria community. The event evolved in 2014, with John and Hank uploading videos every weekday for two weeks, as they had during the first year of the YouTube channel. The merchandise also evolved, introducing fan art printed on objects including blankets and tote bags, and other merchandise such as pizza-scented air fresheners, with all the proceeds donated to charity.

On September 11, 2015, the Greens began listing all videos on the channel under the Creative Commons Attribution 3.0 license. Hank Green later clarified on Reddit that "We didn't mention it, we just switched over. I'm not sure what people would do with a Vlogbrothers video, but I want them to be able to do it."

On August 5, 2016, the project "How to Vote in Every State" was launched. It encourages viewers to register to vote with links to quick, comprehensive videos on how to do so in each state.

In the beginning of 2017, the duo celebrated their ten years on YouTube. In honor of this, they held a one-time convention, NerdCon: Nerdfighteria, that was held in Boston, Massachusetts, from February 25–26, 2017. The convention celebrated the duo's YouTube career and the Nerdfighteria community.

On October 22, 2019, the Green brothers launched a project with Partners in Health to improve maternal health in Sierra Leone, primarily through the building of a Maternal Centre of Excellence. Half of the revenue generated from Vlogbrothers is donated to this cause. The remaining half is split between Complexly and a fund that gives grants to online educational creators.

=== Hank's Hodgkin lymphoma diagnosis and aftermath (2023–present) ===
In light of Hank's May 2023 Hodgkin lymphoma diagnosis, the brothers announced that videos would likely not be uploaded with the same regularity while Hank underwent treatment and John took on more responsibilities at Complexly and DFTBA Records.

== Reception ==
The Greens were able to find a dedicated audience, with Christian Today detailing "their message, celebrating nerdiness, education, science, and imagining others complexly, has resonated loudly across the globe." Margaret Talbot of The New Yorker has praised the topics of the video blogs, describing, "The tone of their monologues ranged from goofily informative... to wonkish." Talbot added, "Many posts dispensed adult wisdom, but in a reassuringly modern way." However, Craig Rubens of GigaOM, gave a more critical review of the video blog, comparing it negatively to the show with zefrank. While Rubens stated that, "none carry Ze's torch with more earnestness than the brothers Green", he closed by saying the Greens' vlog "remains a nerdy knockoff of Ze's seminal work."
