= Nerdfighteria =

Online community

The Nerdfighteria logo, designed by Vondell Swain

The previous Nerdfighter logo, a parody of the Aero Fighters logo

Nerdfighteria (nerd-/faɪˈtɛriə/ fy-TERR-ee-ə) is a mainly online-based community subculture that originated on YouTube in 2007, when the VlogBrothers (brothers John and Hank Green) rose to prominence in the YouTube community. Nerdfighteria, whose followers are individually known as Nerdfighters, grew with their popularity. The term was coined when John misread the title of the arcade game Aero Fighters as Nerd Fighters.

Hank describes it as "a community that [sprang] up around our videos, and basically we just get together and try to do awesome things and have a good time and fight against world suck", which he defines as "the amount of suck in the world". The Greens established The Foundation to Decrease World Suck in order to raise funds and launch projects that would help a variety of causes. Nerdfighters believe in fighting world suck, promoting education, freedom of speech, and the use of the intellect in modern society. Nerdfighters and the Green brothers have collaborated on many projects such as the annual charity fundraiser Project for Awesome and the digital media convention VidCon. The Nerdfighters have been described by The Hollywood Reporter and The Wall Street Journal, with participants estimated to be 100,000 in 2014.

== Community topics ==
Nerdfighteria is known for its online collaborative nature: forums, spinoff blogs, meet-ups, and charitable events have been created by its members. Instances of the community collaborating can be observed in the creation of college campus groups at universities such as the University of Maryland, Texas Christian University, the University of British Columbia, and the University of California, Los Angeles. Another Nerdfighter club was founded at Auburn University, in which the members have stated their desire to do charity work with The Humane Society and This Star Won't Go Out.

The Nerdfighter subculture's outpouring of support helped convince Penguin Books to release the novel The Fault in Our Stars five months early. Additionally, safety concerns caused by 5,000 fans crowding the stage at the 2014 Q&A tour at the Dolphin Mall caused the event to be shut down early.

=== Symbols and terminology ===
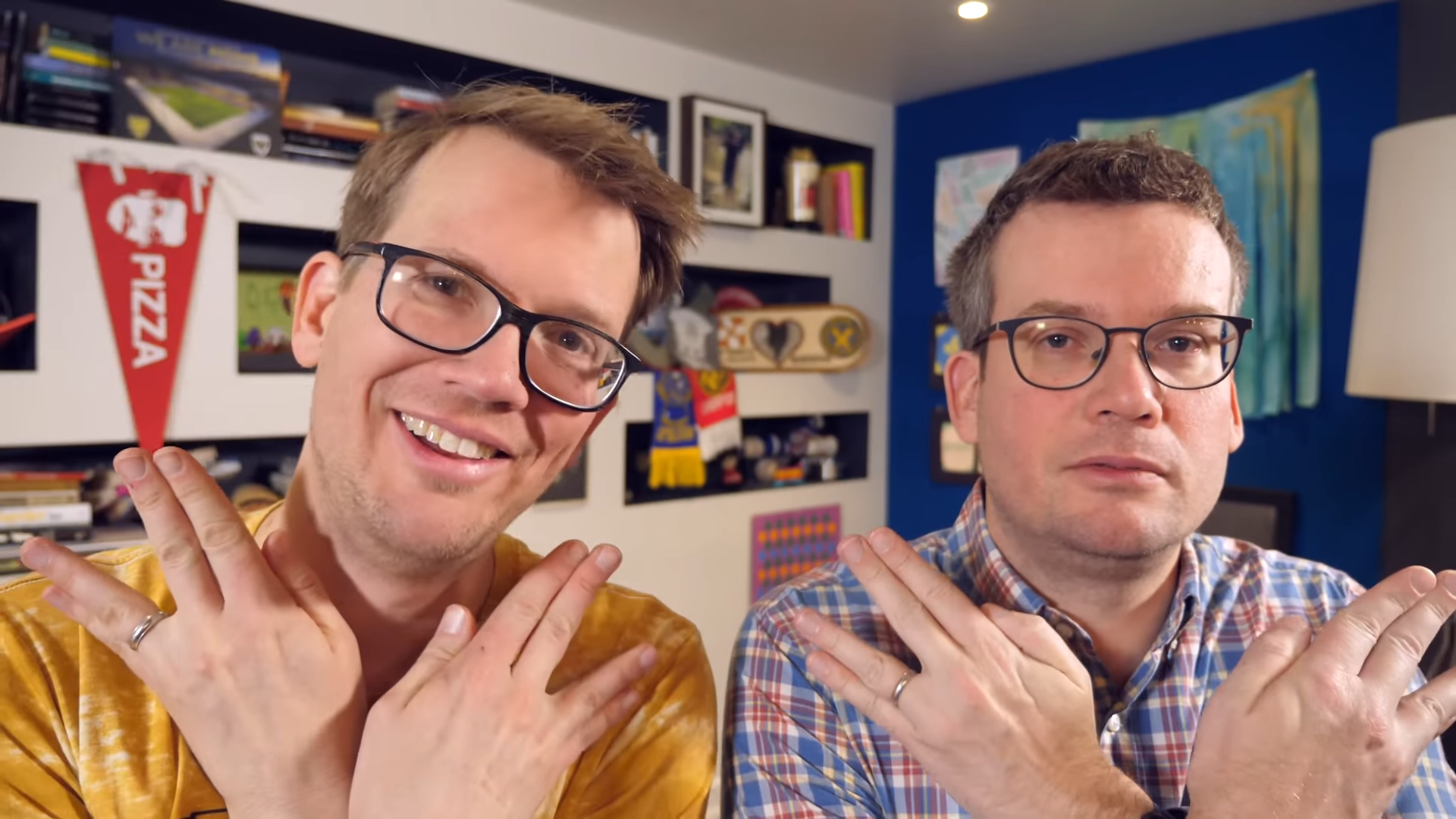
Hank and John performing the Nerdfighter hand sign in 2021

"What is a Nerdfighter? A Nerdfighter is a person who instead of being made out of, like, bones and skin and tissue, is made entirely of awesome."

— Hank and John Green, defining what a Nerdfighter is (2009)

A prominent symbol in Nerdfighter culture is a double-handed gesture with crossed arms, with both hands in a v-symbol, similar to Star Trek's "Vulcan salute". Celebrities such as actor Benedict Cumberbatch and Olympian Jennifer Pinches have been documented demonstrating Nerdfighter hand gestures. The symbol has been referred to as a Nerdfighter "gang sign" or a "salute". Additionally, the initialism "DFTBA", standing for "Don't Forget To Be Awesome", is generally considered the motto of the community.

"World suck" is another word included in the Nerdfighter vocabulary, which refers to unfavorable things that occur in the world. To decrease "world suck", the Greens founded a charitable nonprofit organization, in which Nerdfighters collaborate to promote social activism.

Pizza John, a graphic representation of a mustachioed John accompanied by the word "Pizza", is a long-standing inside joke and symbol within Nerdfighteria. On December 1, 2009, John uploaded a video called Shaving for Pakistan in which he had a mustache for the last two seconds. Nerdfighter Valerie Barr used this image to create the original Pizza John, a monochrome image of mustachioed John on a red background with the word "Pizza" underneath in sans serif font. This image was made available as a t-shirt in 2010, and it remains DFTBA Records' bestselling shirt. Over the years, Pizza John has been remixed by community members in a variety of graphic styles and mediums. Pizzamas is an annual community holiday and charity event that celebrates Pizza John.

=== Meetups and events ===
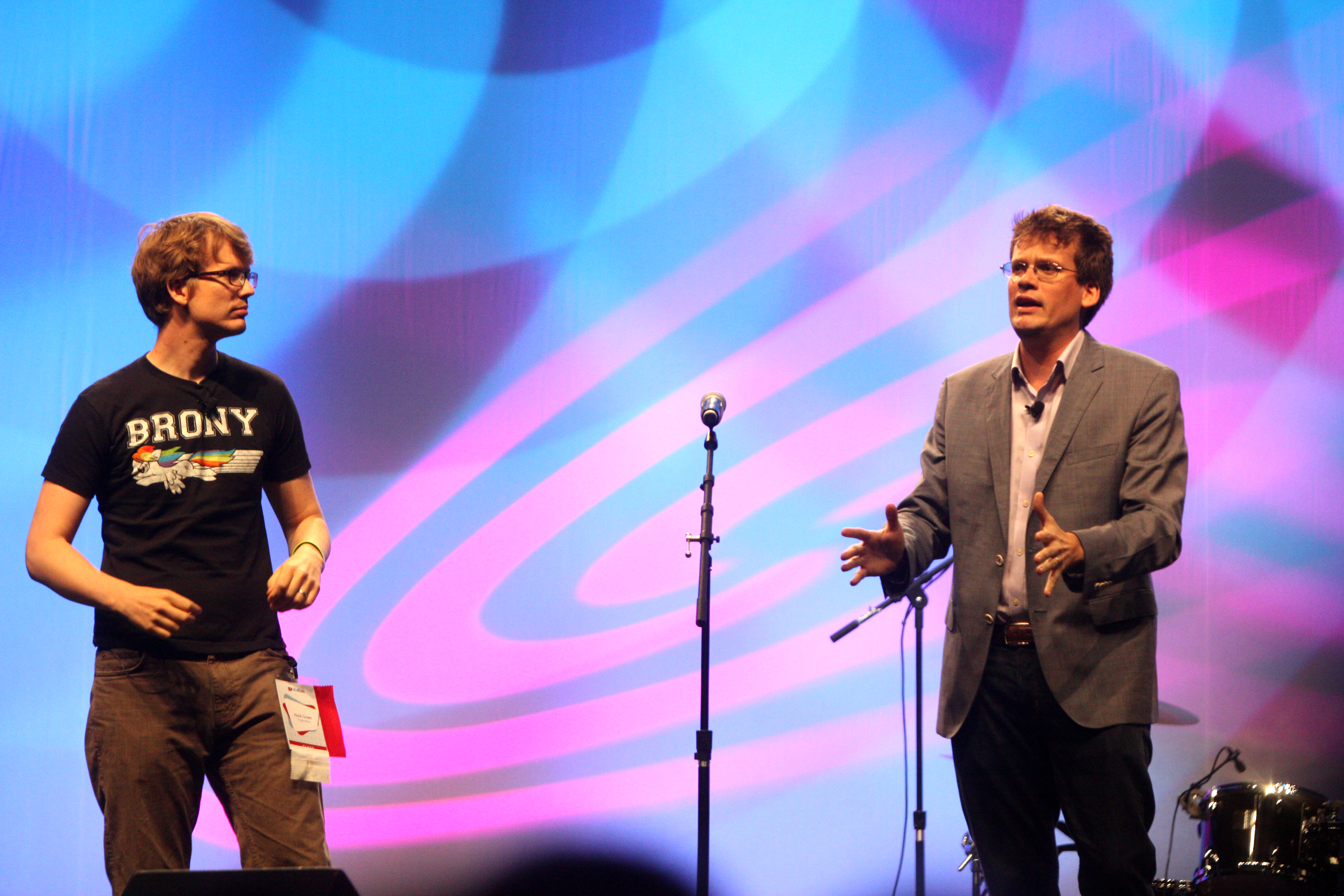
Hank (left) and John Green at VidCon 2012

The collaborative nature of the Nerdfighter community has resulted in meetups, sometimes involving the Green brothers. In 2008, the Greens held an event in Chicago, which proved to be a turning point for both the Green brothers, as well as Nerdfighteria. Hank recalled the event as the first time he could sell his music, as well as a precursor for DFTBA Records. John added to his brother's comments, stating, "This was also the first time I met Rosianna, who is now my assistant, and the first time we really understood the power of nerdfighter gatherings, and it happened at the Chicago Public Library, one of the first places to get behind my novels in a big institution-wide way, and wow, what an important day in our lives." The event would be the first of several meetups within the community, as the Greens founded VidCon, which was first held in 2010, attracting 1,400 attendees.

In February 2017, the NerdCon: Nerdfighteria convention was held in Boston to celebrate Nerdfighteria's 10th anniversary. The event included panels, live podcast recordings, signings, and music performances.

=== Annual Nerdfighter Census ===
In 2013, Hank Green began an annual "Nerdfighter Census". The census survey is hosted on SurveyMonkey, and its results are analyzed by Hank.

In 2014, over 100,000 people filled out the survey. Hank discovered that 72% of the responders were female, 85% are non-Hispanic white, as well as mostly American between the ages of 13 and 30.

In 2021, the survey had 149,308 respondents. Hank commented that Nerdfighteria had gotten older, with about 25% of respondents over the age of 30 (compared to 5% in 2014).

== Charity events and activism ==
A video by Water.org thanking Nerdfighteria for a donation campaign

A key component of the Nerdfighter community is the involvement with charity events and fan activism. Events such as Project for Awesome, have allowed a way for Nerdfighter involvement with charitable actions.

Nerdfighters work closely with another group that promotes community activism, Fandom Forward. Nerdfighteria and Fandom Forward were able to raise $123,000 for Partners in Health, enough to send five cargo planes to Haiti, as a way to assist the citizens of Haiti following the 2010 earthquake.

=== Kiva.org Nerdfighters ===
Nerdfighters are the third largest community of lenders to Kiva.org, a nonprofit organization that helps people lacking access to traditional banking systems by granting loans to them.

Various instances of microloans from Nerdfighters funding entrepreneurs in developing countries have been documented. Exercising the interactive nature of the community, the Greens made a deal of sorts with Nerdfighteria: to have the community reach over $1 million in funds donated to Kiva before the Greens reached 1,000 videos on their VlogBrothers channel. Nerdfighters accomplished this. As of April 2026, Nerdfighters have loaned $27.3 million, ranking #3 all-time across all teams on Kiva.org.

=== Project for Awesome ===
2013 Project for Awesome logo

A major event in the Nerdfighter community is Project for Awesome. The event, initially known as the "Nerdfighter Power Project for Awesome", launched in 2007, and occurred annually in December through 2019 before being moved to February beginning in 2021. Of the overwhelming amounts the event has raised, Hank has said, "YouTube was caught pretty off guard by the first P4A, but ever since then they've been hugely supportive." During Project for Awesome, people post videos advocating for worthy charities, and the Nerdfighter community votes for the charities they believe are most deserving of funding.

In 2014, this system was modified so that money raised on the first day goes to Save the Children and Partners in Health, and money raised on the second day goes to the community-chosen organizations. This change was enacted so that wealthy charities feel comfortable donating to P4A and to ensure that some charities are reputable ones known to do a great deal of good. The first-day recipients in the 2015 campaign were Save the Children and the United Nations High Commissioner for Refugees.

Donations from the Project for Awesome contributed to the construction of the Paul E. Farmer Maternal Center of Excellence, a maternity hospital in Sierra Leone containing the nation's first neonatal intensive care unit. Contributions from Nerdfighteria and the Green brothers totaled $50 million. The hospital opened to the public in 2026.

=== AFC Wimbledon ===
Aside from charity drives, Nerdfighteria also offers funding and support for AFC Wimbledon, a third-tier football club in England. Ad revenue from John's videos on the Green brothers' YouTube gaming channel, Hankgames, go to sponsoring and supporting the football club.

In January 2014, John Green became an official sponsor of the club, and later in the year the Greens' sponsorship led to a Nerdfighter logo design, with the DFTBA catchphrase being featured on the club's kits. In 2015, AFC Wimbledon was drawn to play a match against Liverpool F.C., who John has been a longtime fan of. Green flew to London to see the game in person. One of the spectator stands at Wimbledon's now-former stadium, Kingsmeadow, was named after John at the start of the 2015–16 season.

In April 2016, John announced he would be making a "docudrama" with "comedic moments" about the story of AFC Wimbledon, set to be distributed by 20th Century Fox.

=== This Star Won't Go Out and Esther Day ===
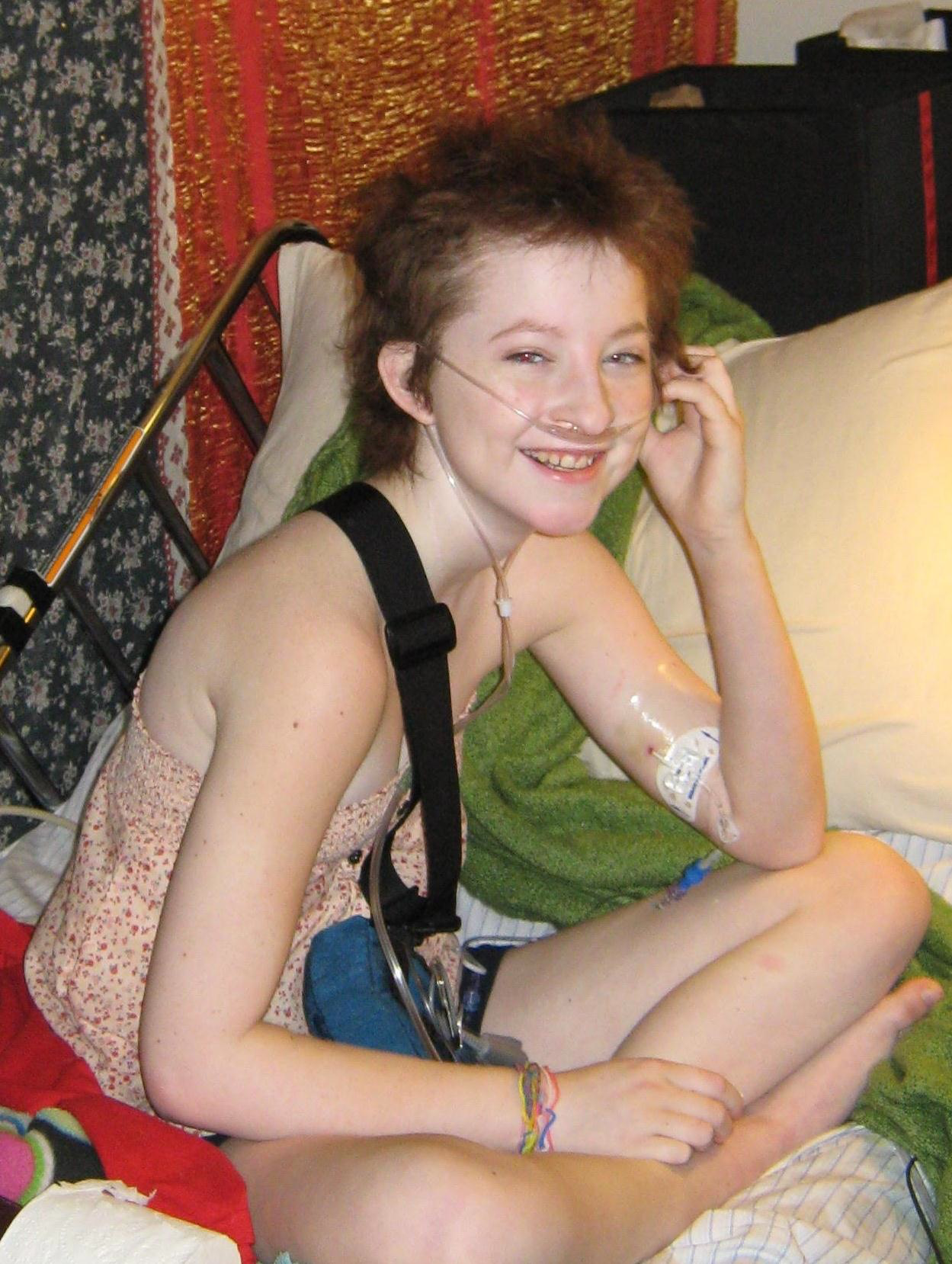
Esther Earl

Another nonprofit foundation associated with the community is This Star Won't Go Out, founded by Wayne and Lori Earl in memory of their daughter, Esther. The foundation's name stems from the fact that "Esther" means "star" in Persian. The program provides funds and assistance to families of children with cancer. Esther Earl was diagnosed with thyroid cancer in 2006, and, before her death in 2010, developed a bond with the VlogBrothers and the Nerdfighter community. She and John Green met and bonded at a Harry Potter conference in 2009. She was involved with Nerdfighteria and YouTube, as she was a vlogging personality, until her death on August 25, 2010, at age 16.

On August 2, 2010, the day before Esther's 16th birthday, John uploaded a video in preparation for "Esther Day", which would be celebrated the following day. Earl said she wanted the day to be about "family and love". Two days after her death, the VlogBrothers made a video titled Rest In Awesome, Esther, remembering her and all of her contributions to the Nerdfighter community, as well as the world. Nerdfighteria continues to keep her memory alive through her foundation, as well as Esther Day, which is celebrated each year on August 3. John Green has said that Esther Day is the "most important holiday in Nerdfighteria" and that Esther has become a hero in the community.

Earl was an inspiration for the character Hazel in John Green's novel The Fault in Our Stars, as well as its film adaptation.

=== Pizzamas ===
Pizzamas is a two-week community holiday and charity event that takes place each year in September. Limited-edition Pizza John-themed merchandise becomes available on pizzamas.com, including many t-shirts designed by independent artists. Other Pizzamas merchandise has included stickers, blankets, rugs, guitar picks, tote bags, LED "neon" signs, and Chizza John (a decorative planter inspired by Chia Pet). Starting in 2014, John and Hank also started celebrating Pizzamas by making videos back and forth every weekday like they did during Brotherhood 2.0.

In 2008–2023, proceeds from Pizzamas merchandise have raised about $1 million for charitable causes.

=== Tuberculosis activism and TBFighters ===
In July 2023, John enlisted Nerdfighteria's help in a campaign to persuade pharmaceutical company Johnson & Johnson (J&J) to allow generic versions of the tuberculosis drug bedaquiline to be produced, allowing increased global access to the drug. The campaign was successful, and public pressure from the community caused J&J to announce its deal with the Stop TB Partnership a week earlier than originally planned.

In September 2023, John asked the community to organize in support of the "Time for 5" campaign started by Doctors Without Borders and the public health community four years earlier. The campaign calls for Cepheid, an American molecular diagnostics company owned by Danaher Corporation, to lower the cost of its test cartridges, which are used to detect diseases including tuberculosis. Some members of the Nerdfighter community created a central website called TBFighters, and called the corporate office, sent emails and letters, and posted graphics and memes on social media urging Danaher to lower the cost. One week later, Cepheid and Danaher announced a 20% price reduction for one of their TB test cartridges in high TB-burden countries, although the test used to diagnose the most severe form of TB remains at the same price.

At the request of Partners In Health, TBFighters recruits community members to meet with their legislators in Washington, D.C. about tuberculosis for the annual "TB Hill Day." At the 2025 event, about 250 activists met with representatives from 49 states.
