= Project for Awesome =

Annual charity event

Project For Awesome
- Abbreviation: P4A
- Formation: December 17, 2007; 18 years ago
- Tax ID no.: 45-3782765
- Purpose: Charity
- Region served: Worldwide
- Key people: Hank and John Green
- Parent organization: Foundation to Decrease World Suck
- Revenue: $3,615,189 (2025)
- Website: projectforawesome.com

A 2011 Project for Awesome video promoting the Wikimedia Foundation

Project for Awesome (often abbreviated P4A) is a community-driven charitable movement on YouTube, created by the Green brothers, Hank and John, run through their Vlogbrothers YouTube channel and through their online community known as Nerdfighteria. Formerly dubbed the Nerdfighter Power Project for Awesome, the project has taken place annually since 2007. The movement was started to have YouTubers create innovative videos promoting their favorite charity and upload it by a certain deadline, with the aim that their promoted charity gains more awareness, and donations from audiences.

For most of the project's history, a central feature has been a telethon-style live stream, typically lasting 48 hours, to help coordinate viewers' efforts. The majority of the live stream is co-hosted by Hank and John, with other internet creators guest hosting for an hour at a time. Past guests have included Brennan Lee Mulligan, Travis McElroy, Destin Sandlin, Tessa Violet, and The Gregory Brothers. Staff from partner charities, such as Dr. Joia Mukherjee from Partners In Health, are also featured on the stream. Until 2019, the P4A took place each December, but in 2020 it was announced that the event would be held in February moving forward, beginning with the next edition in 2021.

Since 2007, the project has raised more than $20 million for charities including Save the Children, Partners In Health, and organizations nominated by the community.

== Governance ==
Fundraising for the Project for Awesome is operated as a project of its parent organization, the Foundation to Decrease World Suck. The Foundation was conceived of and informally established on March 6, 2007, by Hank Green of the Vlogbrothers during the Brotherhood 2.0 project. It was incorporated in Montana as a non-profit corporation on November 9, 2011, and was designated a 501(c)(3) charitable organization by the IRS on January 23, 2013.

As of February 2026, the Foundation is governed by an eight-member board of directors.

== History ==
=== Origin and early live streams (2007–2009) ===
On December 17, 2007, at noon EST, individual contributors to the Greens' original "secret project" posted over 400 videos in near simultaneity, promoting charities including UNICEF, Autism Speaks, and Toys for Tots. The project successfully resulted in a large majority of videos on the YouTube front page being related to the cause, all bearing the same P4A thumbnail. The Greens were able to accomplish this feat with the collaborative efforts of the community that follows their videos, Nerdfighteria, while also "sort of" hacking YouTube's algorithm. Reflecting on the inaugural event in 2012, Hank Green explained, "YouTube was sort of a weird place that was fairly easy to sort of game the algorithms. And the way that the thumbnails worked and all of the different lists were important for getting views," adding, "it was sort of frowned upon to game the system, but we thought, 'What if we gamed the system for good?'" The 2007 project was deemed a success, one that the Greens aimed to emulate over the following years, by uniting their community.

The project returned annually on December 17 in subsequent years and increased in popularity as a grassroots attention campaign intended to simultaneously generate awareness for hundreds of charities. A concurrent telethon-style live stream event was established in 2008 to help coordinate viewers' efforts throughout the project. Early live streams, primarily focused on algorithmic boosting of participating videos through community-driven mass commenting and rating, were held on BlogTV in 2008 and Livestream.com in 2009 before moving to YouTube in 2010.

=== Introduction of fundraising and donation perks (2010–2020) ===
Centralized fundraising began with the 2010 edition, at first via the project's website with assorted raffles and auctions. As the Project for Awesome continued to grow in size, crowdfunding moved to Indiegogo in 2012, enabling a more robust system of offering physical and digital "perks" to encourage community donations to the fund, resulting in a nearly sevenfold increase in funds raised over the previous year. An example of a perk would be the 2014 project's, An Imperial Affliction, a prop novel read in The Fault in Our Stars.

The 2013 campaign raised $721,696 of its $869,591 total on Indiegogo, setting a then-record for the most funded video/web campaign in the platform's history. Leading up to the 2014 project, John Green told The Indianapolis Star that "our goal is to find a way to raise $1 million," adding, "that's what we really hope will happen." It was the first year the project successfully surpassed that mark.

After the 2019 campaign, Hank Green shared on Twitter that the Young Democrats of America passed a resolution honoring the work of the P4A.

=== Date change and continued growth (2021–present) ===
Following three successive years of declining fundraising totals from 2017 to 2019, it was announced on April 29, 2020, that the Project for Awesome would move from December to February, citing feedback that December "is an extremely busy time" for organizers and participants alike. As such, the event was not held in 2020, with the event next scheduled for Presidents' Day weekend in February 2021. The 2021 edition also introduced a shift to Tiltify as the crowdfunding platform.

The 2021 Project for Awesome earned more in crowdfunded donations than any other year up to that point, totalling $1,490,012, reaching one million dollars in donations via Tiltify in under 36 hours. The following year's project was the first to pass the $3 million mark, and in 2026 the project passed $4 million.

Over several years, the portion of Project for Awesome funds raised for Partners in Health was put toward construction of the Paul E. Farmer Maternal Center of Excellence, a maternity hospital in Sierra Leone containing the nation's first neonatal intensive care unit. The hospital opened to patients on February 14, 2026, coinciding with the annual fundraiser.

== Funds raised, by event ==
| Dates | Raised | Ref(s) |
|---|---|---|
| Dec 17–18, 2007 | —N/a (Note: From its inception in 2007 through the 2009 edition, the Project for Awesome was primarily an attention campaign focused on spreading awareness toward community-featured charities, and did not raise funds centrally. Central fundraising began in 2010.) | |
| Dec 17–18, 2008 | —N/a | |
| Dec 17–18, 2009 | —N/a | |
| Dec 17–18, 2010 | ~$140,000 (Note: Funds raised in 2010 included ~$110,000 in "small donations from individuals" toward raffle entries, and ~$30,000 in larger donations from "notable YouTube stars".) | |
| Dec 17–18, 2011 | $71,348 | |
| Dec 17–18, 2012 | $483,426 | |
| Dec 17–18, 2013 | $869,591 | |
| Dec 12–13, 2014 | $1,226,382 | |
| Dec 11–12, 2015 | $1,546,384 | |
| Dec 9–11, 2016 | $2,151,285 | |
| Dec 15–17, 2017 | $2,029,007 | |
| Dec 7–9, 2018 | $1,640,051 | |
| Dec 6–8, 2019 | $1,430,957 | |
| Feb 12–14, 2021 | $2,368,016 | |
| Feb 25–27, 2022 | $3,236,501 | |
| Feb 17–19, 2023 | $3,069,995 | |
| Feb 16–18, 2024 | $3,531,261 | |
| Feb 14–16, 2025 | $3,740,595 | |
| Feb 13–15, 2026 | $4,216,082 | |
| Total | ~$31,750,881 | |
