= The Fault in Our Stars =

2012 novel by John Green

- Author: John Green
- Cover artist: Rodrigo Corral
- Language: English
- Genre: Young adult novel; realistic fiction
- Published: January 10, 2012 (Penguin Books)
- Publication place: United States
- Media type: Print (hardcover, paperback), audiobook, ebook
- Pages: 313
- Awards: Premio Bartolomé Hidalgo
- ISBN: 0-525-47881-7

The Fault in Our Stars is a novel by John Green. It is his fourth solo novel, and sixth novel overall. It was published on January 10, 2012.

The title is inspired by Act 1, Scene 2 of Shakespeare's play Julius Caesar, in which the nobleman Cassius says to Brutus: "Men at some time were masters of their fates, / The fault, dear Brutus, is not in our stars, / But in ourselves, that we are underlings."

Green was inspired to write the book after working as a student chaplain in a children's hospital, and it is dedicated to his friend Esther Earl, who died of thyroid cancer in 2010, age 16. The story is narrated by Hazel Grace Lancaster, a 16-year-old girl with thyroid cancer that has affected her lungs. Hazel is forced by her parents to attend a support group where she subsequently meets and falls in love with 17-year-old Augustus Waters, an ex-basketball player, amputee, and survivor of osteosarcoma.

An American feature film adaptation of the same name as the novel directed by Josh Boone and starring Shailene Woodley and Ansel Elgort was released on June 6, 2014. A Hindi feature film adaptation of the novel, titled Dil Bechara, which was directed by Mukesh Chhabra and starring Sushant Singh Rajput, Sanjana Sanghi, Saswata Chatterjee, Swastika Mukherjee and Saif Ali Khan, was released on July 24, 2020, on Disney+ Hotstar. Both the book and the film adaptation enjoyed strong critical and commercial success, with the former becoming one of the best-selling books of all time.

== Plot ==
Hazel Grace Lancaster, a 16-year-old with terminal thyroid cancer, attends a cancer patient support group at her mother's behest. At one meeting, Hazel meets a 17-year-old boy currently in remission named Augustus Waters, whose osteosarcoma caused him to lose his right leg. Augustus is at the meeting to support Isaac, his friend who has eye cancer. Hazel and Augustus strike a bond immediately and agree to read each other's favorite novels. Augustus gives Hazel The Price of Dawn, and Hazel recommends An Imperial Affliction, a novel about a cancer-stricken girl named Anna that parallels Hazel's own experience. After Augustus finishes reading her book, he is frustrated upon learning that the novel ends abruptly without a conclusion, as if Anna had died suddenly. Hazel explains the novel's author, Peter van Houten, retreated to Amsterdam following the novel's publication and has not been heard from since.

A week later, Augustus reveals to Hazel that he has tracked down Van Houten's assistant, Lidewij, and, through her, has managed to start an e-mail correspondence with Van Houten. The two write to Van Houten with questions regarding the novel's ending; he eventually replies, explaining that he can only answer Hazel's questions in person. At a picnic, Augustus surprises Hazel with tickets to Amsterdam to meet Van Houten, acquired through the story's version of the Make-A-Wish Foundation, "The Genie Foundation".

Upon meeting Van Houten, Hazel and Augustus are shocked to discover that he is a mean-spirited alcoholic. Horrified by Van Houten's hostile behavior towards the teenagers, Lidewij confesses to having arranged the meeting on his behalf. Lidewij resigns as Van Houten's assistant and takes Hazel and Augustus to the Anne Frank House, where Augustus and Hazel share their first kiss. Later that night Hazel and Augustus lose their virginity to one another in Augustus's hotel room, confessing their love for each other.

The next day, Augustus reveals that his cancer has returned. Upon their return to Indianapolis, Augustus's health continues to deteriorate, resulting in him staying in the ICU for a few days. Fearing his death, Augustus invites Isaac and Hazel to his pre-funeral, where they give eulogies. Augustus dies soon after, leaving Hazel heartbroken. Van Houten shows up at Augustus's funeral to apologize to Hazel.

Hazel learns that Augustus had written a eulogy for her, and reads it after Lidewij discovers it amidst Van Houten's letters. It states that getting hurt in this world is unavoidable, but we do get to choose whom we allow to hurt us. Augustus writes that he is happy with his choices, and hopes Hazel likes hers too. The book closes with Hazel stating that she is happy with her choice.

== Origins ==
After graduating from Kenyon College, Green spent about five months working as a student chaplain at Nationwide Children's Hospital in Columbus, Ohio. He has cited this experience as inspiration for his story:

I tried to write that book for almost 10 years. Ever since I worked as a chaplain, I would go back, I was trying to work on what I called the Children's Hospital Story, although in all of its previous incarnations, it starred this 22-year-old hospital chaplain, who was, like, surprisingly handsome and, like, hooking up with doctors. It was very embarrassing. I hope that — it was just terrible. But you know, I would go back to that story and go back to it and go back to it. Then in 2010 a good friend of mine died of cancer, a young friend, and I went back to the story, and I went back to it angry and needing to work.

This young friend who died was Esther Earl, who is named in the book's dedication.

Green worked on The Fault in Our Stars in 2011, while staying as a writer in residence in Amsterdam at the invitation of the Dutch Foundation for Literature.

Two books served as an inspiration for the fictional book An Imperial Affliction: The Blood of the Lamb by Peter De Vries and Infinite Jest by David Foster Wallace.

== Publication history ==
On December 21, 2011, Barnes & Noble accidentally shipped 1,500 copies of The Fault in Our Stars before the release date to people who had pre-ordered the book. Green released a statement saying, "Mistakes happen. The people who made this error were not bad or incompetent people, and they were not acting maliciously. We all make mistakes, and it is not my wish to see Barnes and Noble or any of their employees vilified." Many people who received the book pledged not to read it until its release date, January 10, 2012, or discuss it until the next day, January 11, as per a request of Green's not to spoil it for other readers. Most kept to this promise, leaving the experience untarnished for those who got the book on the intended release date.

The book rose to #84 on the Amazon.com and Barnes & Noble bestseller lists in June 2011 shortly after its title was announced. Green promised that every pre-order would be hand-signed by him, requiring him to sign every copy of the first printing. He proposed that the general public vote on the color Sharpie he would use to sign the books, resulting in him signing the 150,000 books with a variety of Sharpie colors, each in proportion to the number of votes received for that color. However, some people who ordered from international booksellers received unsigned copies because those bookstores, including Amazon UK, underestimated how many books they needed and ordered more after the signing was complete, but Green agreed to fix this problem, telling people with unsigned pre-orders to email him so they could be sent a signed bookplate. Many fans submitted their book cover designs to various outlets including Tumblr and Twitter, tagging Green in these posts so he could see them. The sizeable number of posts received prompted Green's publisher Penguin to seek a fan-designed cover for a reprint of one of Green's other books, An Abundance of Katherines. The Fault in Our Stars debuted at No. 1 on The New York Times Best Seller list for Children's Chapter Books and remained in that spot for seven consecutive weeks. A Hebrew edition of The Fault in Our Stars was published in Israel in August 2012 and more editions of the novel are forthcoming in Dutch, German, Spanish, French, Swedish, Danish, Icelandic, Chinese, Persian and Portuguese. The Fault in Our Stars has also gained places on several bestseller lists. It was No. 1 on The Wall Street Journal bestseller list, No. 1 on the Indiebound bestseller list, and No. 9 on The Bookseller bestseller list. The novel was also The New York Times Book Review Editor's Choice. As of January 2013, there are nearly 1 million copies of the novel in print. In December 2012, it was announced that a special edition with a silver cover and an expanded Q&A, dubbed the 'Exclusive Collector's Edition', would be available from Barnes & Noble. All or at least most of the copies first available for purchase of this edition of the book contained a printing error wherein several pages of the first chapter were replaced with pages from the Q&A section at the back of the book. As of October 2017, the book has sold 23 million copies, making it one of the best-selling books of all time.

== Reception ==
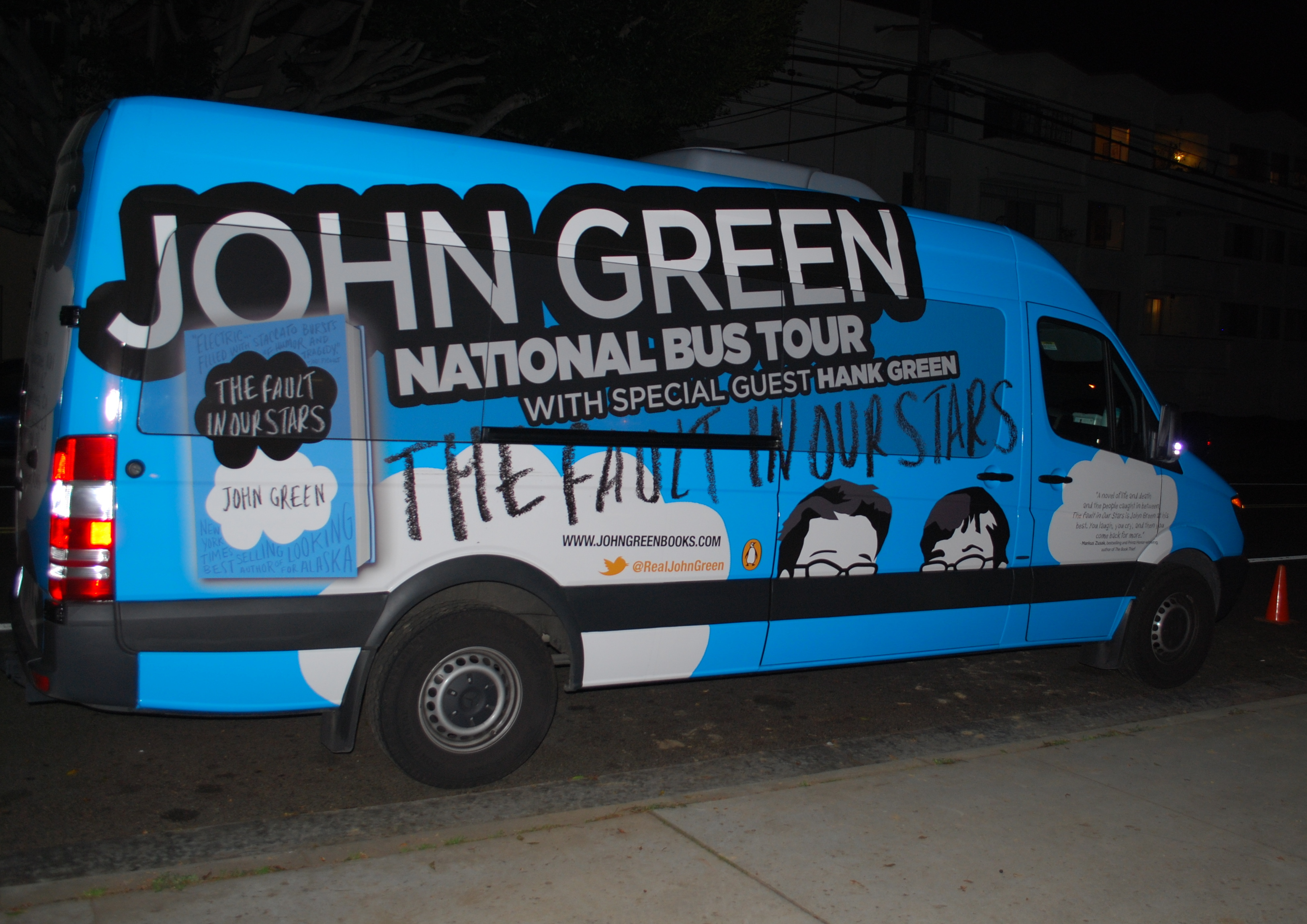
A tour van decorated for The Fault In Our Stars book tour in 2012

The New York Times' review of the book called it "a blend of melancholy, sweet, philosophical and funny" and said that it "stays the course of tragic realism", while noting that the book's unpleasant plot details "do nothing to diminish the romance; in Green's hands, they only make it more moving". NPR's Rachel Syme noted that "[Green's] voice is so compulsively readable that it defies categorization", saying that the "elegantly plotted" book "may be his best". Time called The Fault in Our Stars "damn near genius". Entertainment Weekly wrote, "[Augustus and Hazel's] love story is as real as it is doomed, and the gut-busting laughs that come early in the novel make the luminous final pages all the more heartbreaking", and gave the novel an overall A− grade. The Manila Bulletin says that the book is "a collection of maudlin scenes and trite observations about the fragility of life and the wisdom of dying. And while it does talk about those things and more, the treatment of it is far from being maudlin or trite." The Manila Bulletin also added that "Just two paragraphs into the work, and he immediately wallops the readers with such an insightful observation delivered in such an unsentimental way that its hard not to shake your head in admiration." The Manila Bulletin stated that The Fault in Our Stars was a triumph for John Green. USA Today called it an "elegiac comedy". They gave the book a rating of four out of four stars. The School Library Journal stated that it was "a strong choice for young adult collections". The Fault in Our Stars received a starred review from Kirkus Reviews, who described it as "a smartly crafted intellectual explosion of a romance".

Several well-known authors have contributed their own positive reviews for the book. Jodi Picoult, author of My Sister's Keeper, calls The Fault in Our Stars "an electric portrait of young people who learn to live life with one foot in the grave". She goes on to say that the novel is "filled with staccato bursts of humor and tragedy". Bestselling author of The Book Thief, Markus Zusak, describes it as "a novel of life and death and the people caught in between" and "John Green at his best". Pertaining to Green's writing throughout the book, E. Lockhart, author of The Boyfriend List, says: "He makes me laugh and gasp at the beauty of a sentence or the twist of a tale. He is one of the best writers alive and I am seething with envy of his talent." Time named The Fault in Our Stars as the No. 1 fiction book of 2012. Kirkus Reviews listed it among the top 100 children's books of 2012. It also made USA Today's list of the top 10 books of 2012. In 2013, the Edmonton Journal named the book one of their "favourite books of the year".

One notable unfavorable opinion appeared in the Daily Mail: the entire genre, as well as the genre of young-adult novels dealing with suicide and self-harm, was criticized as being "distasteful" and inappropriate for their target audience of teens. The Guardian criticized the piece, pointing out in particular that The Fault in Our Stars was chosen by The Guardian as that month's "teen book club choice" because "it's a gripping read, featuring two compelling characters, that deals sensitively and even humorously with a difficult situation without descending into mawkishness". In general, The Guardian faulted the Daily Mail for suggesting that the issues of illness, depression, and sexuality are inappropriate precisely "in the one place where difficult subjects have traditionally been most sensitively explored for teens: fiction written specifically for them". For his part, in an interview for The Guardian, John Green said: "The thing that bothered me about The Daily Mail piece was that it was a bit condescending to teenagers. I'm tired of adults telling teenagers that they aren't smart, that they can't read critically, that they aren't thoughtful, and I feel like that article made those arguments."

== Adaptations ==
=== English-language film ===
In January 2012, Fox 2000 Pictures optioned the movie rights to adapt the novel into a feature film. Scott Neustadter, Michael H. Weber and Josh Boone wrote the adapted screenplay, with Josh Boone also serving as director. Shailene Woodley stars as Hazel, while Ansel Elgort plays Augustus.

Principal photography took place between August and October 2013, with Pittsburgh, Pennsylvania, doubling for the novel's setting of Indianapolis, and included some location shooting in Amsterdam. The film was released on June 6, 2014, in the United States, receiving positive reviews and grossing over $307 million worldwide against its budget of $12 million.

=== Hindi-language film ===
In August 2014, India's Fox Star Studios announced it would adapt the novel into an Indian Hindi-language film, with the working title of Kizie Aur Manny. Producer Karan Johar was supposed to produce the film but eventually backed out. Filming began in July 2018, in Jamshedpur, with first-time director Mukesh Chhabra guiding lead actor Sushant Singh Rajput (in his final film role) and lead actress Sanjana Sanghi (in her film debut). This adaptation ages up the characters and changes the main setting to India. The title of the movie was later changed to Dil Bechara ("The Helpless Heart") and is named after one of the original songs written for the movie that the director felt summed up the message of the film. Music composer A. R. Rahman has composed the background music and songs of the movie.

The film was scheduled to be released on May 8, 2020, after having been initially scheduled in November 2019, but was later postponed due to the COVID-19 pandemic in India. It was released on July 24, 2020, on Disney+ Hotstar and was met with mainly positive reviews.

=== Stage play ===
In 2017, Green authorized an amateur stage play adaptation of the book. The play was written by theatre director Tobin Strader of Brebeuf Jesuit Preparatory School in Indianapolis and four students at the high school. It was performed in 2019.
