= Crash Course (web series) =

Educational YouTube channel

- YouTube channel icon
- Genre: Educational
- Created by: John Green; Hank Green
- Developed by: Complexly; PBS Digital Studios
- Written by: Various
- Directed by: Stan Muller; Nicholas Jenkins; Brandon Brungard; Nicole Sweeney; Hannah Bodenhausen
- Presented by: List of presenters: John Green; Hank Green; Phil Plait; Craig Benzine; Stan Muller; Adriene Hill; Jacob Clifford; Shini Somara; Andre Meadows; Carrie Anne Philbin; Mike Rugnetta; Nicole Sweeney; Emily Graslie; Lily Gladstone; Michael Aranda; Thomas Frank; Jay Smooth; Evelyn Ngugi; Jabril Ashe; Anna Akana; Deboki Chakravarti; Taylor Behnke; Alizé Carrère; Rae Wynn-Grant; Clint Smith; Pardis Sabeti; Vanessa Hill; M Jackson; Alexis Nikole Nelson; Samuel Ramsey; Sabrina Cruz; Yasser Abumuailek; Corina Perez; Mini Contreras; Yumna Samie; James Tanton; Will Comar; Jessica Pucci; Erica Brozovsky; Naia Butler-Craig; Emily Zarka; Jason Guglielmo; Cassandra Ryder; Danielle Bainbridge; Dave Jorgenson; Carmella Boykin; Chris Vasquez; Robert Fuller; Katie Mack; Déja Fitzgerald; Matt Sopha; Kim Holst; Miriam Nielsen; Philip Lindsay; Ellie Anderson; Shan Boodram; Che Jim
- Theme music composer: Jason Weidner
- Country of origin: United States
- Original language: English
- No. of seasons: 55
- No. of episodes: 1548 (Note: as of March 16th 2022)

Production
- Executive producers: John Green; Hank Green; Heather Di Diego
- Producers: Stan Muller; Nicholas Jenkins; Nicole Sweeney; Brandon Brungard; Hannah Bodenhausen
- Production locations: Indianapolis, Indiana; Missoula, Montana; Toronto, Ontario; Los Angeles, California
- Editors: Stan Muller; Brandon Brungard; Nicholas Jenkins; Nicole Sweeney; Hannah Bodenhausen; Brigid Kennison
- Camera setup: Multi-camera
- Running time: 6–15 minutes 2–4 minutes (Kids; Recess)

Original release
- Network: YouTube
- Release: January 26, 2012 – present

Related
- SciShow; Vlogbrothers

Crash Course (sometimes stylized as CrashCourse) is an educational YouTube channel started by John Green and Hank Green (collectively the Green brothers), who became known on YouTube through their Vlogbrothers channel.

Crash Course was one of the hundred initial channels funded by YouTube's $100 million original channel initiative. The channel launched a preview on December 2, 2011, and as of March 2026, it has accumulated over 17 million subscribers and 2.2 billion video views. The channel launched with John and Hank presenting their respective World History and Biology series; the early history of the channel continued the trend of John and Hank presenting humanities and science courses, respectively. In November 2014, Hank announced a partnership with PBS Digital Studios, which would allow the channel to produce more courses. As a result, multiple additional hosts joined the show to increase the number of concurrent series.

As of 2026, there are over 50 main series of Crash Course, of which John has hosted nine and Hank has hosted seven. Together with Emily Graslie, they also co-hosted Big History. A second channel, Crash Course Kids, was hosted by Sabrina Cruz and completed a series on Science. The first foreign-language course, an Arabic reworking of the original World History series, is hosted by Yasser Abumuailek. The main channel has also begun a series of shorter animated episodes, called Recess, that focus on topics from the previous Crash Course series. A collaboration with Arizona State University titled Study Hall began in 2020, which includes less structured learning in its topics.

== History and funding ==
=== YouTube-funded and Subbable periods (2011–2014) ===
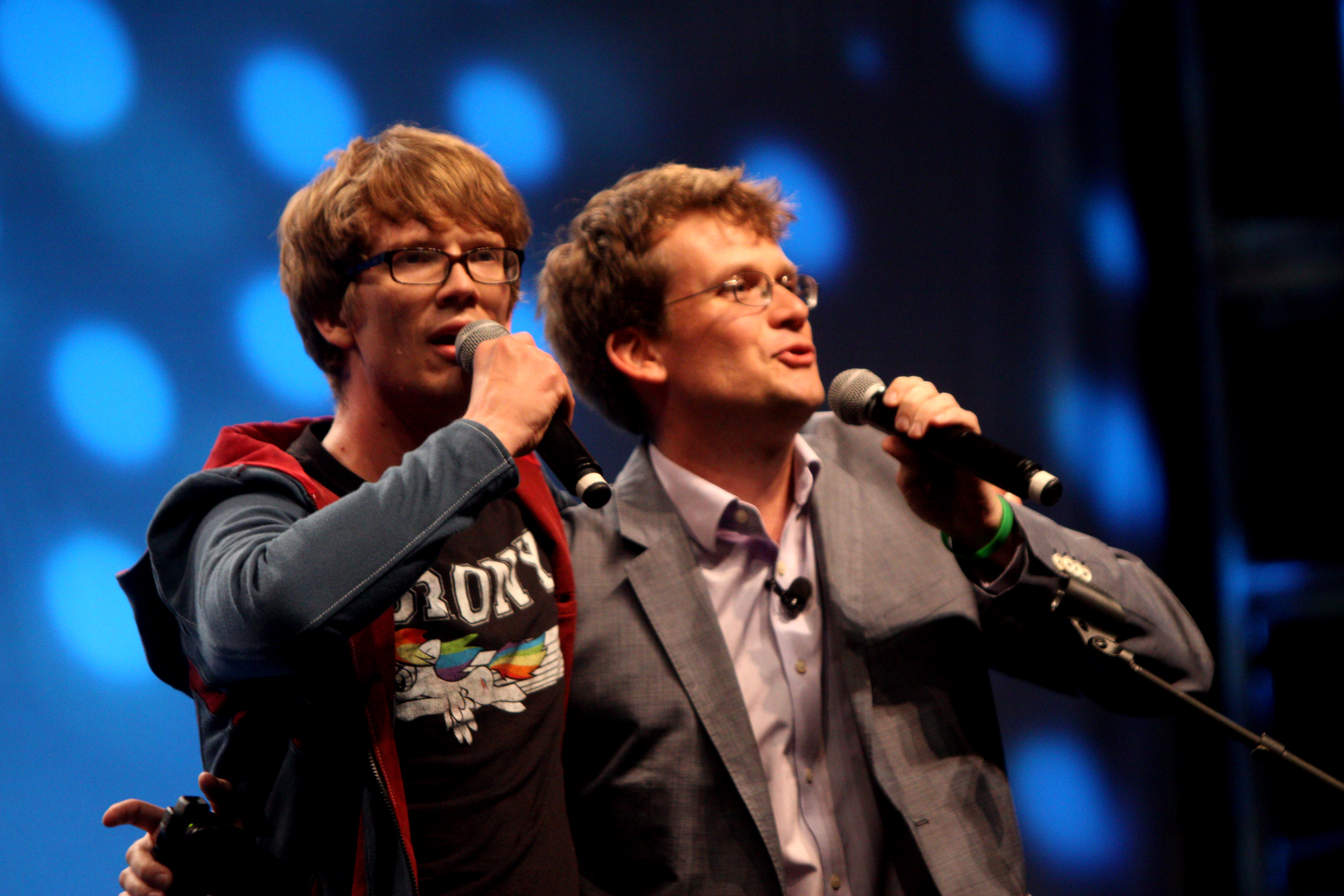
Hank (left) and John Green (right), shown here in 2012, co-created Crash Course and hosted the initial Biology and World History series, respectively.

The Crash Course YouTube channel was conceived by the Green Brothers after YouTube approached them with an opportunity to launch one of the initial YouTube-funded channels as part of the platform's original channel initiative. The channel was teased in December 2011, and then launched on January 26, 2012, with the first episode of its World History series, hosted by John Green. The episode covered the Agricultural Revolution, and a new episode aired on YouTube every Thursday through November 9, 2012. Hank Green's first series, Crash Course Biology, then launched on January 30, 2012, with its first episode covering carbon. A new episode aired on YouTube every Monday until October 22 of that year. The brothers would then go on to end 2012 with two shorter series, with John and Hank teaching English literature and ecology, respectively.

Following their launch year, John and Hank returned in 2013 with US History and Chemistry, respectively. However, that April, John detailed that Crash Course was going through financial hardships; in July, Hank uploaded a video titled "A Chat with YouTube", in which he expressed his frustration with the ways YouTube had been changing and controlling its website. Eventually, YouTube's original channel initiative funding ran out, and shortly after Hank's video, the Green brothers decided to launch Subbable, a crowdfunding website where viewers could donate monthly to channels in exchange for perks. On launching Subbable, Hank Green stated: "We ascribe to the idealistic notion that audiences don't pay for things because they have to[,] but because they care about the stuff that they love and want it to continue to grow". Crash Course was the first channel to be offered on Subbable, and for a time the website crowdfunded the channel. In March 2015, Subbable was acquired by Patreon, and Crash Course's crowdfunding moved over as part of the acquisition.

In May 2014, John mentioned an upcoming 10-episode Crash Course season on Big History, funded by a grant from one of Bill Gates's organizations. The series outlined the history of existence, from the Big Bang forward into the evolution of life. Both Green brothers hosted the series, with Emily Graslie also participating as a guest host.

=== Partnership with PBS Digital Studios (2014–2017) ===
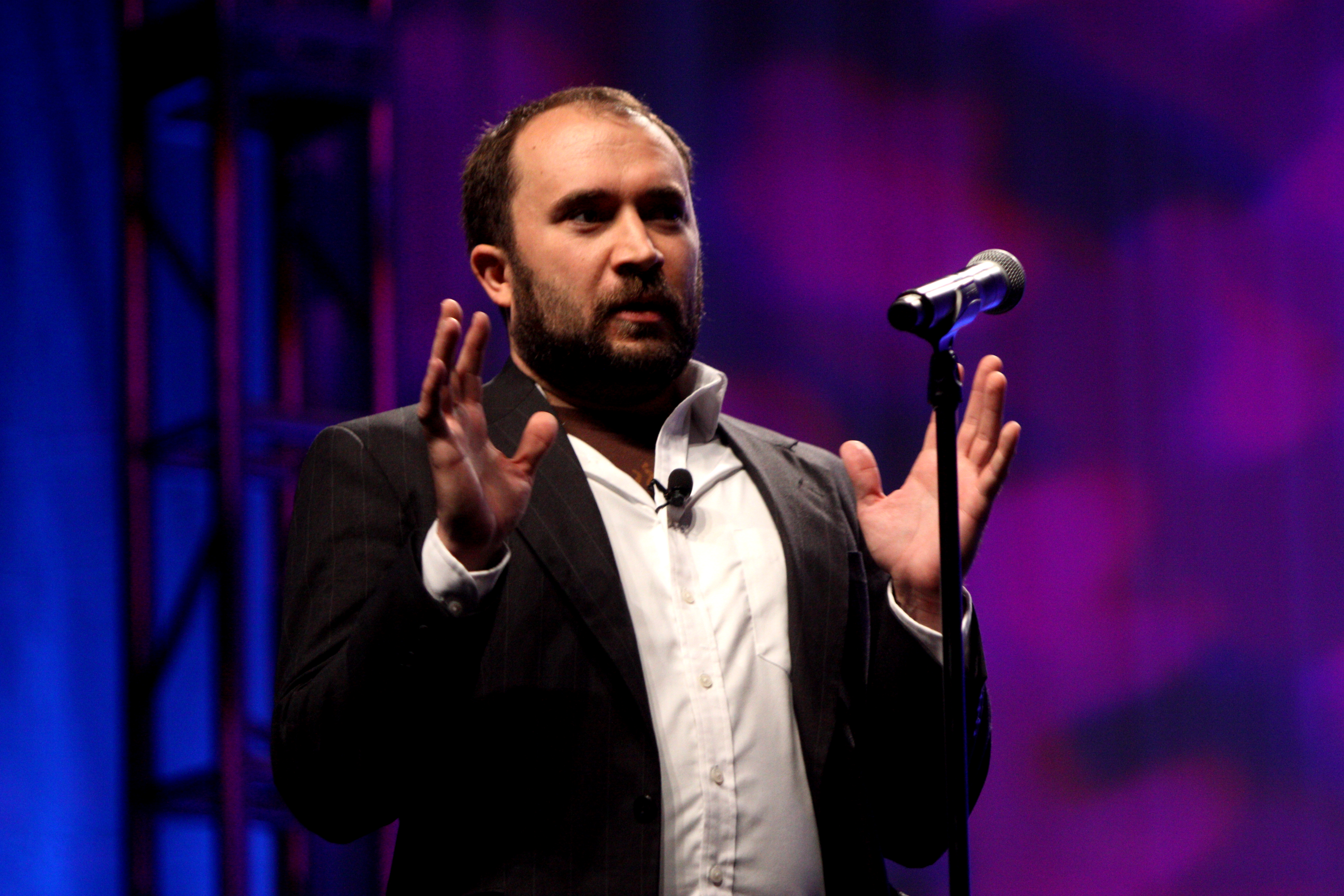
Craig Benzine, host of US Government and Politics, was brought on as part of the PBS Digital Studios funding deal.

In 2014, Crash Course announced a partnership with PBS Digital Studios, which began in 2015 with the Astronomy and US Government and Politics series. In addition to funding the channel itself, the partnership also entails PBS Digital Studios helping Crash Course to receive sponsorships. As a result of the partnership as well as John commencing a year-long hiatus from the show in 2015, additional hosts were added to increase the number of concurrent series. Though the partnership meant PBS Digital Studios would assist with the production of Crash Course, the channel continued to receive funding from its audience through Patreon. In April 2015, The Guardian reported that Crash Course received $25,900 per month through Patreon donations. Aside from the new series on the main channel, Crash Course Kids was launched in February on a new Crash Course Kids channel. The series was hosted by Sabrina Cruz, known on YouTube as Answer in Progress.

On October 12, 2016, the Crash Course YouTube channel uploaded a preview for Crash Course Human Geography. Hosted by Miriam Nielsen, the course was to discuss "what Human Geography isn't, and what it is, and discuss humans in the context of their world." Two episodes were posted during each of the following two weeks; however, the videos were removed on October 27, with John Green stating on Twitter that "...we got important things wrong. We'll rework the series... And we'll bring a better series to you in a few months." On October 31, John further explained that the videos were removed due to "factual mistakes as well as too strident a tone," and that the mishap was caused by a rushed production stemming from a lack of staffing and budgeting. The following October, during an "Ask Me Anything" (AMA) session on Reddit, John indicated the course may not return for some time, noting that "we don't feel like we've cracked it yet." The channel would go on to launch their Geography course in November 2020, intended to cover both physical and human geography over its run.

In 2017, Crash Course launched three film-related series: one covered film history, another film production, and the last of which covered film criticism. Also in 2017, Thomas Frank began hosting Crash Course Study Skills, which covered topics such as productivity skills, time management, and note-taking.

=== Complexly branding and YouTube Learning Fund (2018–2019) ===
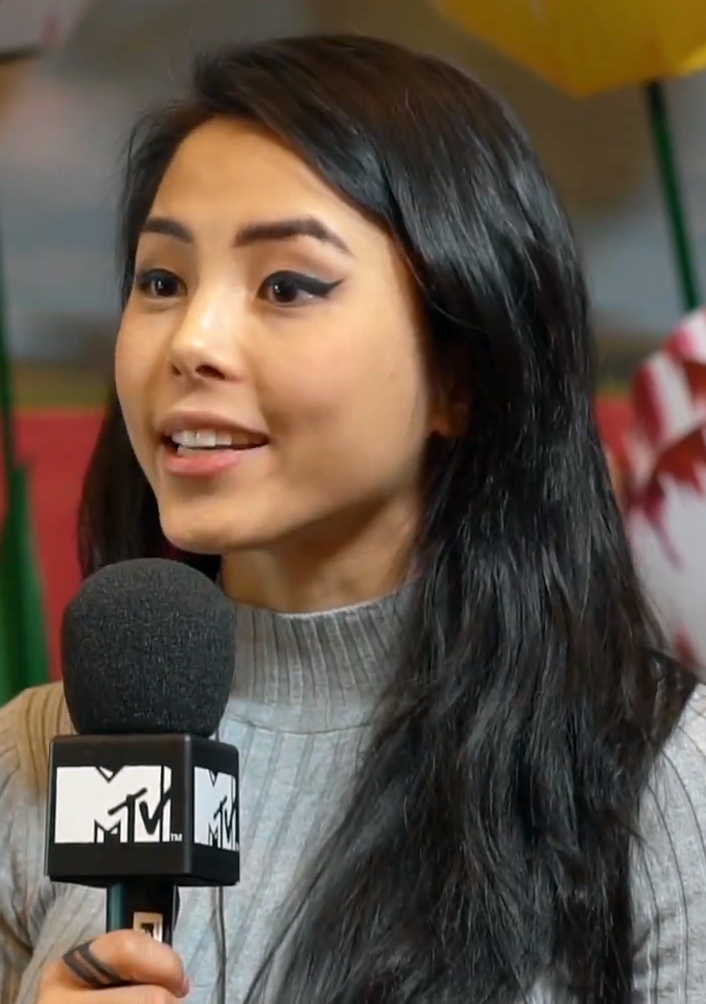
Anna Akana hosted Business: Entrepreneurship in 2019.

Starting with the Statistics course in early 2018, Crash Course series that are not PBS co-productions began to directly identify as Complexly productions. Also that year, Crash Course launched an Arabic-language edition of World History hosted by Yasser Abumuailek and produced by Deutsche Welle (DW), which was uploaded to DW's Arabic YouTube channel. In July 2018, YouTube announced its YouTube Learning initiative, dedicated to supporting educational content on the platform. A few months later, as $20 million was invested into expanding the initiative, Crash Course secured additional funding via the initiative's Learning Fund program. However, PBS Digital Studios remained one of the primary sources of funding Crash Course, and the network also continued to help in finding sponsorships for the show.

The channel surpassed 1 billion video views in February 2019. In July, YouTube launched Learning Playlists as a continuation of their Learning Fund initiative; while videos in Learning Playlists notably lack recommended videos attached to them, in contrast to videos included in regular playlists on YouTube, they also include organizational features such as chapters around key concepts and lessons ordered by difficulty. After Learning Playlists' launch, Crash Course's video content was formatted into several of these playlists. The channel reached 10 million subscribers in November 2019.

=== Partnership with Arizona State University (2020–present) ===
A collaboration with Arizona State University (ASU) titled Study Hall was announced in March 2020, which includes less structured learning in its topics. It was hosted by ASU alumni and advised by their faculty, with episodes posted on the university's YouTube channel but production and visual design by Complexly in the Crash Course style. The partnership was renewed in 2022, with two new series premiering: Fast Guides is appearing on a new dedicated Study Hall channel, focusing on showing what students can expect to study in a given major; and How to College on the main Crash Course channel, showing the process of choosing, applying for, and starting at a given institution.

In January 2023, Crash Course announced that they would be offering college courses on YouTube, in continued partnership with ASU and Google. The course content would be available online for free, with the full online course available through ASU for US$25, which would be led by ASU faculty and include direct interaction. Students would then have the option to spend US$400 to receive college credit for the course that would be transferable to any institution that accepts ASU credits.

== Production ==
In an interview with Entrepreneur, Crash Course producer and Sociology host Nicole Sweeney detailed:

Every year we have a big pitch meeting to determine what courses and things we're going to do the next year. In that meeting, we talk about a number of different things, but the rising question that motivates that meeting and then down the line as we're making decisions about what we're doing is what we think would be most useful for people.

To make its content as useful as possible to viewers, the Crash Course channel hires experts relating to the topics of its series to work on the show. The Missoula-filmed series are produced and edited by Nicholas Jenkins, while Blake de Pastino serves as script editor. The Indianapolis-filmed series is produced and edited by Stan Muller, Mark Olsen, and Brandon Brungard. Script editing is credited to Meredith Danko, Jason Weidner composes music for the series, and Sweeney serves as a producer, editor, and director for Crash Course. Raoul Meyer, an AP World History teacher and Green's former teacher at Indian Springs School, wrote the World History series, with John providing revisions and additions. Sweeney has said that she and the respective host go over each script after it is edited to assess it for content.

Sweeney also stated that each ten-minute episode takes about an hour to film. The Philosophy series and all series relating to science (with the exception of Computer Science) were filmed in a studio building in Missoula, Montana that also houses SciShow. The Biology and Ecology series were filmed in front of green screen, but from the Chemistry season onward, each series was filmed on new custom-built sets. The Computer Science series and all series on the humanities (excepting Philosophy and Economics) were filmed in a studio in Indianapolis, Indiana. In addition, Economics was filmed at the YouTube Space in Los Angeles, while Crash Course Kids was filmed in a studio in Toronto, Ontario. Crash Course Kids was directed by Michael Aranda and produced by the Missoula Crash Course team.

Once filmed, an episode goes through a preliminary edit before it's handed off for an animation pass. Graphic design for all of the series except Biology and Ecology was provided by Thought Café (formerly Thought Bubble) until their final work on the Religion series in 2025. Animation is now handled by Complexly. The sound design and music for these series are provided by Michael Aranda (and in later series, his company Synema Studios).

== Formats ==
Crash Course video series feature various formats depending on the host's presentation style as well as the subject of the course. However, throughout all series, the show's host will progressively elaborate on the topic(s) presented at the beginning of the video. Early on in the history of the show, the Green Brothers began to employ an edutainment style for episodes of Crash Course, using humor to blend entertainment together with the educational content.

The World History series featured recurring segments such as the "Open Letter", where Green reads an open letter to a historical figure, period, item, or concept. Occasionally he converses with a naïve, younger version of himself whom he calls "Me from the Past"; this character usually has naïve or obvious questions or statements about the topic of the video. A running joke throughout the series is that the Mongols are a major exception to most sweeping generalizations in world history, noted by the phrase "Wait for it... the Mongols". Mentions of this fact cue the "Mongoltage" (a portmanteau of "Mongol" and "montage"), which shows a drawing of Mongols shouting "We're the exception!" followed by a three-second clip of a scene from the 1963 film Hercules Against the Mongols depicting a village raid. Green also frequently encouraged his viewers to avoid looking at history through Eurocentric or "Great Man" lenses, but instead to be conscious of a broader historical context.

For US History, Green followed the tone set by World History and put an emphasis on maintaining an open, non-Western view of American History. In addition, the "Open Letter" was replaced by a new segment called the "Mystery Document", in which Green would take a manuscript from the fireplace's secret compartment and read it aloud, followed by him guessing its author and the source work it is excerpted from. If incorrect, he would be punished by a shock pen. While the Mongoltage was largely absent, mentions of America's national pride during the series would cue a new "Libertage", which consisted of photos associated with America atop an American flag, with a guitar riff and an explosion at the start and end of the montage, respectively.

The Biology program featured the recurring segment "Biolo-graphy", during which Hank relayed a short biography of someone who was associated with the topic of the episode. Additionally, at the conclusion of each episode, Hank provided YouTube annotations with links to every subtopic he explained within the video. He also noted that the successor series to Biology, Crash Course Ecology, would follow in the spirit of the former series.

== Other releases ==
DVD box sets of the complete run of the Biology series and of season 1 of World History were made available for pre-order on October 31, 2013. In June 2016, the show's official site launched, providing free offline downloads of all episodes of every series completed to date. In May 2020, an official mobile app launched, providing easy access to all of the courses' video content along with rolling out flashcard and quiz study aides for particular courses.

The series was also made available for streaming on Curiosity Stream.

== Related and spinoff projects ==
In 2022, a series called Office Hours began, in which hosts of previous Crash Course series and professors host a livestream and answer viewer questions. In 2024, a Lectures series began, with long-form videos enabling a deeper dive into a single topic. The channel launched its first podcast in 2024. In October 2024, the creation of "Crash Course Books", a new imprint of Penguin Young Readers, was announced, with the first book Everything Is Tuberculosis by John Green set to be released in March 2025.

== Series overview ==
=== Main series ===
Series	Episodes	Series premiere	Series finale	Host(s)	Writer(s)
Launched in 2012
World History	42	January 26, 2012	November 8, 2012	John Green	John Green; Raoul Meyer
Biology	40	January 30, 2012	October 29, 2012	Hank Green	various
Ecology	12	November 5, 2012	January 21, 2013	Hank Green	Jesslyn Shields
English Literature	8	November 15, 2012	January 24, 2013	John Green	John Green
Launched in 2013
US History	48	January 31, 2013	February 6, 2014	John Green	John Green; Raoul Meyer
Chemistry	46	February 11, 2013	January 13, 2014	Hank Green	Kim Krieger
Launched in 2014
Psychology	40	February 3, 2014	November 24, 2014	Hank Green	Kathleen Yale
Literature 2	16	February 27, 2014	June 12, 2014	John Green	Alexis Soloski; Becky Fox; Erik Crew; Rosianna Halse Rojas
World History 2	30	July 11, 2014	April 4, 2015	John Green	John Green
Big History	6	September 17, 2014	January 9, 2015	Hank Green; John Green	David Baker
Launched in 2015
Anatomy & Physiology	47	January 6, 2015	December 21, 2015	Hank Green	Kathleen Yale
Astronomy	46	January 15, 2015	January 21, 2016	Phil Plait	Phil Plait
US Government and Politics	50	January 23, 2015	March 4, 2016	Craig Benzine	Raoul Meyer
Intellectual Property	7	April 23, 2015	June 25, 2015	Stan Muller	Raoul Meyer
Economics	35	July 8, 2015	June 9, 2016	Adriene Hill; Jacob Clifford (Note: Clifford departed after the 29th episode, with Hill presenting the remainder solo.)	Patrick Walsh; Jacob Cliffor; Scott Bauman
Launched in 2016
Philosophy	46	February 8, 2016	February 13, 2017	Hank Green	Ruth Tallman
Physics	46	March 31, 2016	March 24, 2017	Shini Somara	Alyssa Lerner
Games	29	April 1, 2016	December 16, 2016	Andre Meadows	Mathew Powers
Literature 3	9	July 7, 2016	September 8, 2016	John Green	Beth McArthur; Alexis Soloski
Launched in 2017
Computer Science	40	February 22, 2017	December 21, 2017	Carrie Anne Philbin	Amy Ogan; Chris Harrison
World Mythology	41	February 24, 2017	January 28, 2018	Mike Rugnetta	Raoul Meyer
Sociology	44	March 13, 2017	February 12, 2018	Nicole Sweeney	Steven Lauterwasser
Film History	16	April 13, 2017	August 3, 2017	Craig Benzine	Tobin Addington
Big History 2	6	May 24, 2017	July 12, 2017	Emily Graslie	David Baker
Study Skills	10	August 8, 2017	October 10, 2017	Thomas Frank	Thomas Frank
Film Production	15	August 24, 2017	December 14, 2017	Lily Gladstone	Tobin Addington
Literature 4	12	November 7, 2017	February 13, 2018	John Green	Beth McArthur; Alexis Soloski
Launched in 2018
Film Criticism	15	January 11, 2018	April 26, 2018	Michael Aranda	Tobin Addington
Statistics	44	January 24, 2018	January 9, 2019	Adriene Hill	Chelsea Parlett-Pelleriti
Theater	50	February 9, 2018	March 1, 2019	Mike Rugnetta	Alexis Soloski
Media Literacy	12	February 27, 2018	May 15, 2018	Jay Smooth	Aubrey Nagle
History of Science	46	March 26, 2018	April 29, 2019	Hank Green	Wythe Marschall
Engineering	46	May 17, 2018	May 2, 2019	Shini Somara	Michael Sago; Ricky Nathvani
Launched in 2019
Navigating Digital Information	10	January 8, 2019	March 12, 2019	John Green	Aubrey Nagle
Business: Soft Skills	17	March 13, 2019	July 3, 2019	Evelyn Ngugi	Rebecca Upton
European History	50	April 12, 2019	August 28, 2020	John Green	Bonnie Smith
Artificial Intelligence	20	August 9, 2019	December 27, 2019	Jabril Ashe	Lana Yarosh; Yonatan Bisk; Tim Weninger
Business: Entrepreneurship	17	August 14, 2019	December 11, 2019	Anna Akana	Madeline Doering
Launched in 2020
Organic Chemistry	50	April 30, 2020	April 13, 2022	Deboki Chakravarti	Kelley Donaghy; Kat Day; Andy Brunning; Kristen Procko
Linguistics	16	September 11, 2020	January 22, 2021	Taylor Behnke	Gretchen McCulloch; Lauren Gawne
Geography	50	November 30, 2020	April 12, 2022	Alizé Carrère	Jane P. Gardner; Zohra Calcuttawala; April Luginbuhl Mather
Launched in 2021
Zoology	14	April 15, 2021	July 15, 2021	Rae Wynn-Grant	Brittney G. Borowiec
Black American History	51	May 7, 2021	November 9, 2022	Clint Smith	Clint Smith; Danielle Bainbridge; Nia Johnson; Lynae Bogues
Outbreak Science	15	September 7, 2021	December 21, 2021	Pardis Sabeti	Ricky Nathvani
Launched in 2022
How to College	15	March 24, 2022	July 14, 2022	Erica Brozovsky	Michael Lodato; Kaila Kea-Lewis
Public Health	10	August 4, 2022	October 6, 2022	Vanessa Hill	Dylan Reynolds
Climate & Energy	12	December 7, 2022	April 26, 2023	M Jackson	Jaime Chambers; Leila Battison
Launched in 2023
Botany	15	May 18, 2023	September 7, 2023	Alexis Nikole Nelson	Jaime Chambers; Leila Battison; Molly Edwards
Biology (Note: A reimagining of the original subject matter from 2012.)	50	June 6, 2023	July 16, 2024	Samuel Ramsey	Jaime Chambers
Launched in 2024
Art History	22	April 11, 2024	September 26, 2024	Sarah Urist Green	Jaime Chambers
Religions	24	September 10, 2024	March 4, 2025	John Green	Jaime Chambers
Political Theory	13	November 7, 2024	February 13, 2025	Ellie Anderson	Jaime Chambers
Launched in 2025
Sex Ed	15	March 13, 2025	June 26, 2025	Shan Boodram	Jaime Chambers
Native American History	24	May 6, 2025	December 2, 2025	Che Jim; Lily Gladstone	Jaime Chambers
Latin American Literature	13	October 30, 2025	February 26, 2026	Curly Velasquez	Jaime Chambers
Futures of AI	5	November 19, 2025	December 17, 2025	Kousha Navidar	Maya Lannen
Launched in 2026
Scientific Thinking	7	January 20, 2026	March 17, 2026	Hank Green; Sage Magee	Maya Lannen
Geology	-	April 9, 2026	-	Sage Magee	Jaime Chambers
Big Questions on US Government	-	September 22, 2026	-	Kousha Navidar	Jaime Chambers

=== Kids series ===
Hosted on the YouTube channel Crash Course Kids.

Series	Episodes	Series premiere	Series finale	Host
Science	95	March 3, 2015	March 16, 2016	Sabrina Cruz
Literature	6	August 6, 2025	September 10, 2025	Abby Cox

=== Foreign language series ===
Series	Language	Episodes	Series premiere	Series finale	Host
تاريخ العالم (World History)	Arabic (Note: Hosted on the DW عربية channel.)	42	January 19, 2018	July 5, 2018	Yasser Abumuailek
Fundamentos de Química (Fundamentals of Chemistry)	Spanish (Note: Hosted on the Crash Course en Español channel.)	11	March 14, 2023	May 21, 2023	Corina Perez
Biología (Biology)	Spanish	50	June 6, 2023	July 16, 2024	Mini Contreras

=== Miniseries ===
Series	Episodes	Series premiere	Series finale
Recess	2	March 5, 2018	October 2, 2018
A History of Crash Course	1	December 4, 2018	
How Crash Course is Made (Note: A partnership with Adobe and hosted on the Thought Café channel.)	6	March 22, 2019	April 10, 2019
Covid-19 and Public Health (Note: A partnership with Operation Outbreak and the Sabeti Lab at Harvard.)	1	October 19, 2020	
History of Wales (Note: Included in episode 7 of Welcome to Wrexham.)	1	September 14, 2022	

=== Study Hall series ===
A partnership with Arizona State University and hosted on the Study Hall channel.

College Foundations
Series	Episodes	Series premiere	Series finale	Host(s)
Rhetoric & Composition	29	August 8, 2022	March 29, 2023	Emily Zarka
Real World College Math	30	August 9, 2022	April 13, 2023	Jason Guglielmo
Intro to Human Communication	29	August 10, 2022	March 15, 2023	Cassandra Ryder
US History to 1865	30	August 11, 2022	May 5, 2023	Danielle Bainbridge
Power and Politics in US Government	30	August 7, 2023	April 1, 2024	Dave Jorgenson; Carmella Boykin; Chris Vasquez
Code and Programming for Beginners	28	August 9, 2023	March 20, 2024	Sabrina Cruz
Modern World History	30	August 10, 2023	April 4, 2024	Robert Fuller
Intro to Psychology	30	May 7, 2024	December 10, 2024	Déja Fitzgerald
Macroeconomics	31	August 5, 2024	March 24, 2025	Matt Sopha
Sustainability	31	October 2, 2024	June 4, 2025	Miriam Nielsen
Statistics	4	July 29, 2025	–	Sabrina Cruz
Learning Playlists
Composition	15	March 31, 2020	July 7, 2020	Yumna Samie
Algebra	15	April 23, 2020	July 30, 2020	James Tanton
Chemistry	15	September 10, 2020	December 15, 2020	Will Comar
Data Literacy	15	September 10, 2020	December 17, 2020	Jessica Pucci
Other Video Series
How to College	15	March 24, 2022	July 14, 2022	Erica Brozovsky
Fast Guides to Electives and Majors	47	March 25, 2022	–	Hank Green; Erica Brozovsky; Naia Butler-Craig; Cassandra Ryder; Sabrina Cruz; Vanessa Hill
College Journeys	6	June 6, 2024	–	Hank Green
How to Become	7	September 19, 2024	–	Kim Holst; Philip Lindsay
Things to Know	8	September 26, 2024	–	Erica Brozovsky

=== Office Hours series ===
Title	Series premiere	Hosts
Anatomy & Physiology	April 21, 2022	Hank Green; Brandon Jackson
Geography	April 25, 2022	Alizé Carrère; April Luginbuhl Mather
World History	April 26, 2022	John Green; Cathy Keller

=== Lectures series ===
Title	Series premiere	Hosts
Tuberculosis Explained	March 25, 2024	John Green
The Secret Language of Cults	September 16, 2025	Amanda Montell

=== Podcasts ===
Title	Episodes	Series premiere	Series finale	Hosts
Crash Course Pods: The Universe	11	April 23, 2024	September 11, 2024	John Green; Katie Mack

== Reception ==
The Crash Course project has been successful in its reach, with World History alone having attracted millions of viewers. It had a particular appeal to American students taking the AP World History class and exam; many students and teachers use the videos to supplement their courses.

=== Awards and nominations ===
Year	Ceremony	Category	Result	Ref.
2015	Streamy Awards	Science or Education	Nominated	
2015	Webby Awards	Online Film & Video - Science & Education (Channel)	Honoree	
2016	Streamy Awards	Science or Education	Nominated	
2018	Webby Awards	Film & Video - Science & Education (Channels & Networks)	Honoree	
