= Clare Sutcliffe =

Clare Sutcliffe MBE
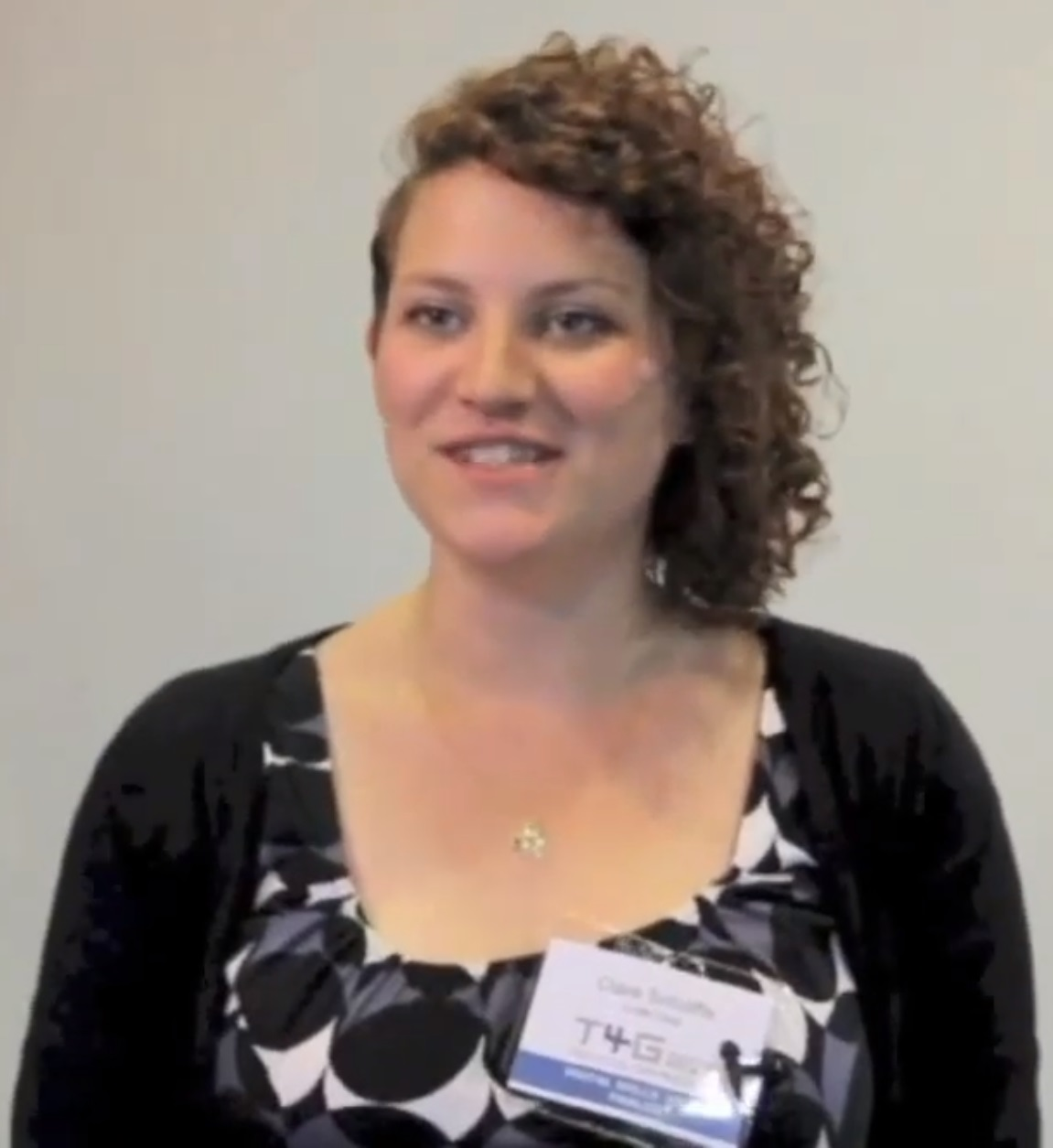
- Sutcliffe speaks at the Technology4Good Awards in 2013
- Education: Bath Spa University
- Known for: Code Club
- Awards: MBE 2016
- Website: claresutcliffe.co.uk

Clare Sutcliffe MBE is a social entrepreneur and the co-founder of Code Club. She was appointed a Member of the Order of the British Empire in 2015.

== Early life and education ==
Sutcliffe studied graphic design at Bath Spa University.

== Career ==
After graduating, Sutcliffe worked in web design. She joined Pixelgroup in 2010, where she started BrainyHacks, a non technical hacking event. In 2012 she joined marketing agency Albion and designed the messaging application for Telefónica. She spoke about Hacking the Future at TEDx Brighton.

Sutcliffe co-founded Code Club with Linda Sandvik in 2012. She was Chief Executive Officer, responsible for 4,000 after school coding clubs for children aged 9 to 13 years old. Code Club creates educational material for volunteers who teach children for an hour after school. Half of the volunteers are from private sector companies. The children learn how to program, build computer games and make websites. They program in Scratch, then HTML, CSS and Python. Sutcliffe got funding from Arm and Google. Code Club went global in 2014. She has provided evidence for the government on the UK's fragmented digital skills training. In 2015 Sutcliffe launched CodeClubPro to better support computer science teachers.

Sutcliffe led Code Club to merge with the Raspberry Pi Foundation in 2015 and was appointed executive director of communities and outreach.

In 2016, she was appointed an MBE in the New Year Honours. She was named one of Computer Weekly's Most Influential Women in IT. She left the Raspberry Pi Foundation in March 2018.

She was appointed the Chair of Trustees at the Beam Foundation in October 2018.
