= Shini Somara =

British author, producer and media broadcaster

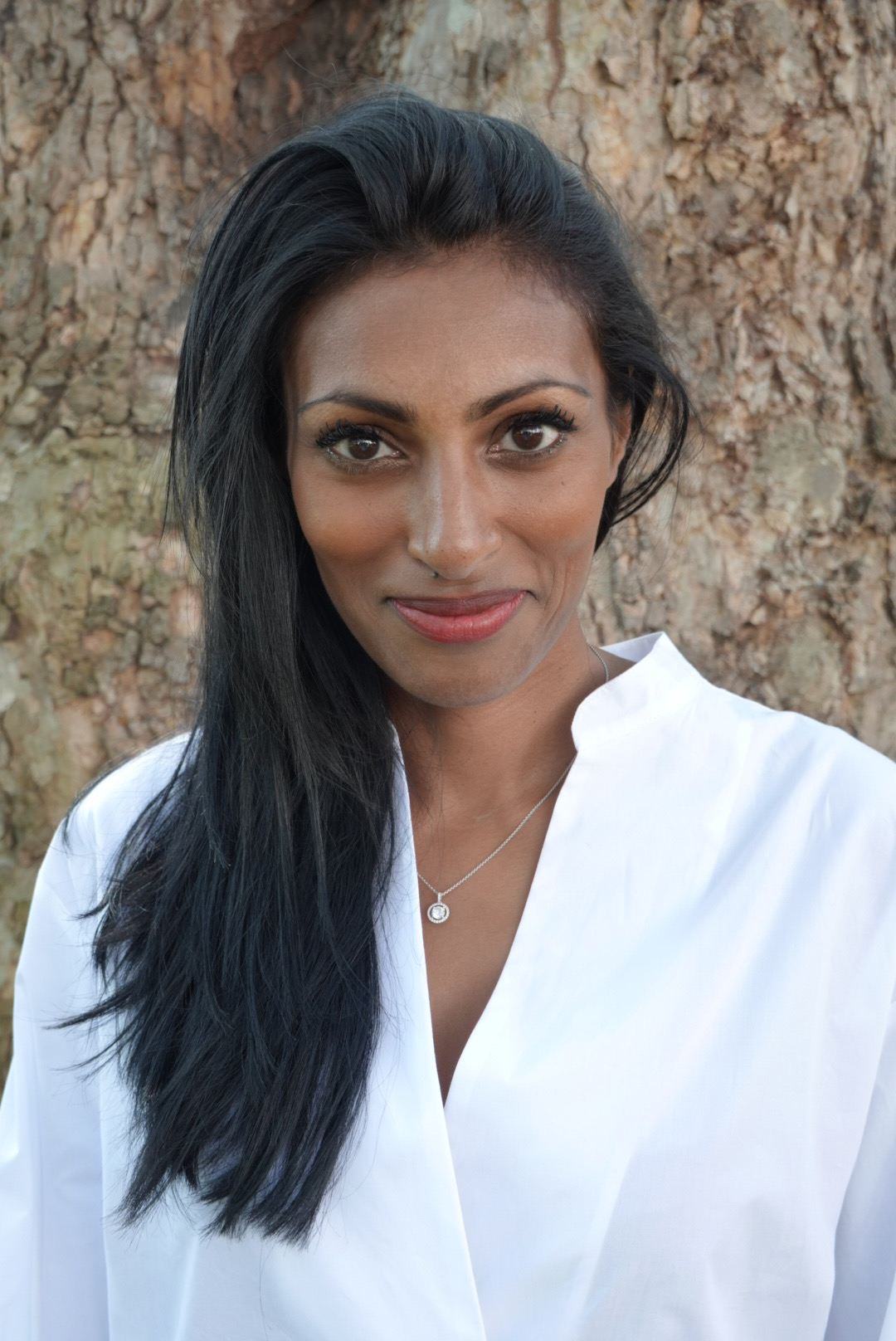
- Born: Shini Somarathne; July 30, 1979 (age 47); London, England
- Education: Henrietta Barnett School
- Alma mater: Brunel University
- Known for: Fluid dynamics, promoting women in STEM, children’s books, science education and reporting
- Scientific career
- Fields: Author, broadcaster and producer
- Thesis: Dynamic thermal modelling using CFD (2003)

Shini Somara (born Shini Somarathne; July 30, 1979) is a British mechanical engineer, media broadcaster, producer and author. She has presented TechKnow on Al Jazeera America and reporting for various BBC shows including The Health Show. Somara has also hosted two educational series of physics and engineering videos on the Crash Course YouTube channel for PBS Digital Studios. She has been a presenter on BBC America, Sky Atlantic, BBC1, BBC2, and PBS.

== Early life and education ==
Somara is the eldest of three daughters born to a Sri Lanka-born mechanical engineer and his Malaysian wife (both studied at South Bank University, formerly Borough Polytechnic Institute). Somara's father runs a mechanical engineering consultancy for building services.

Born and raised in London, Somara studied at Henrietta Barnett School, and began her mechanical engineering career at Brunel University London, completing a Bachelor of Engineering before moving on to an engineering doctorate (EngD), which she was awarded in 2003 for her doctoral thesis, Dynamic Thermal Modelling Using CFD. Somara's specialization was in computational fluid dynamics, where computer simulations are used to visualise phenomena invisible to the naked eye, helping engineers to understand how fluids flow.

Somara has a published paper in the International Journal of Ventilation titled "Transient Solution Methods for Dynamic Thermal Modelling within CFD".

== Career ==
=== Media ===
Somara's broadcasting career started in 2011 when she presented on the BBC's The Health Show, covering developments in global health. Later that year, she began hosting No Kitchen Required which aired in 2012 on BBC America. The show involved three professional chefs immersing themselves in alternative culture with tribes and attempting to cook using unfamiliar tribal methods. The first season included trips to Dominica, New Zealand, Thailand and Fiji.

In 2013, Somara started working on the Al Jazeera America talk show TechKnow - a 30-minute show about science and technology. It outlines innovations in technology and science and how they are changing lives of people in America. The shows are recorded with a group of contributors with backgrounds in science and technology.

Between 2014 and late 2016, Somara worked on several BBC productions, including Tomorrow's Food, Battle of Jutland and Secrets of Orkney with Neil Oliver and Chris Packham, and for Sky Atlantic.

In early 2016, Somara started working with PBS Digital Studios on Crash Course Physics (an online educational resource explaining complicated theories in a simple way with intuitive visuals). She extended her involvement with Crash Course in 2018 with a new series, Crash Course Engineering.

In 2020, Somara was a reporter on the scientific program Razor on CGTN. In January 2021, she was a regular commentator on Science Channel's Engineering Catastrophes.

=== STEM and other work ===
On 10 February 2017, Somara made a speech to the United Nations about women and girls in STEM (science, technology, engineering, and mathematics).

On International Women in Engineering Day in June 2018, Somara launched her first podcast called "Scilence", to provide a platform for women to speak anonymously about their experiences in STEM and what it is like to work in an industry dominated by males. "Scilence" later developed into several more Science podcasts including "Innervation", "eSTEAMd" and "Innovators Making a Difference", as well as "Mission Responsible" which was co-created with Dr Simon Clark in 2024.

Somara is a mentor at Imperial College London and is on the E&T Innovation Awards advisory board of the Institution of Engineering and Technology.

Somara has also written seven STEM books for young people including Engineers Making a difference, which was published by Imperial College and The Gatsby Foundation. In 2024, the book was shortlisted for the Royal Society Young People's Book Prize. She has written an engineering book for younger readers called An Engineer Like Me, the first in a series of four books (including A Scientist Like Me, A Coder Like Me and A Mathematician Like Me).

== Awards ==
In 2024 she was recognised as one of the Top 50 Influential Women in Engineering.
