= Vanessa Hill =

Scientist and Television presenter

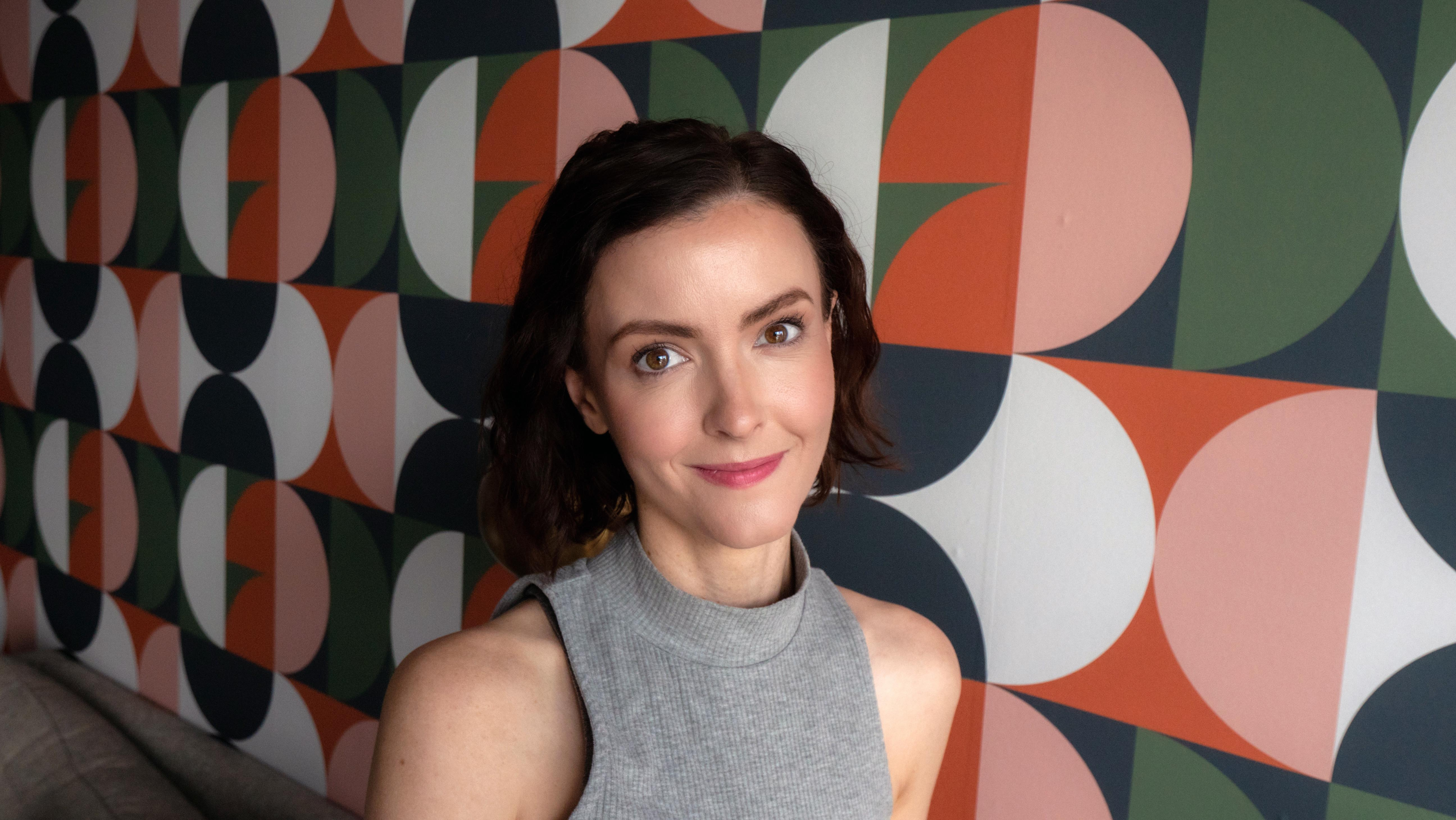
- Hill in 2023
- Born: Vanessa M. Hill
- Education: University of New South Wales (BSc); Australian National University (MSc); Central Queensland University (Ph.D)
- Occupations: Television presenter; Scientist

Instagram information
- Page: Dr Vanessa Hill

YouTube information
- Channel: BrainCraft
- Years active: 2013–present
- Subscribers: 622 thousand
- Views: 30.6 million
- Last updated: 10 March 2026
- Website: www.nessyhill.com

Vanessa M. Hill (born 3 March 1987) is an Australian scientist, television presenter and science communicator who is best known for her YouTube series BrainCraft. Hill has hosted a PBS series of the same name since 2014.

As an academic, Hill has focused on technology and sleep habits, including the investigation of bedtime procrastination.

== Early life and education ==
Vanessa M. Hill, Australia and developed her interest in science while walking dingoes around Taronga Zoo. In 2008, Hill graduated from the University of New South Wales with a Bachelor of Science and then completed a Master of Science Communication at the Australian National University. She completed a PhD at Central Queensland University and has published papers on bedtime procrastination.

== Career ==
In 2008, Hill began working for CSIRO, a federal government agency for scientific research as an educator. In 2013, she won the CSIRO medal for excellence and hosted a series on DIY Experiments for the agency.

In 2014, Hill was hired by PBS after presenting her idea for BrainCraft as a stop-motion science series. She further collaborated with PBS and Screen Australia in 2017 to direct and host Mutant Menu, a global exploration of new gene editing technology that was PBS Digital Studio's first long-form documentary, and in 2018 for Attention Wars, an online exploration of the behavioral psychology behind social media.

Hill is a host of the ABC series Sciencey and appears as a regular guest on ABC Radio, Dear Hank & John, DNews and SciShow.

In 2019, Hill was announced as a AAAS Women in STEM ambassador and was represented in the largest collection of statues of women ever assembled at the Smithsonian Institution.

== YouTube ==
Hill created her YouTube channel BrainCraft in 2014. BrainCraft is part of the PBS Digital Studios network. Her videos address phenomena related to memory, sleep, brain hacks, and the science of food.

Hill has been outspoken about the hateful comments directed towards women on YouTube. In 2018, Hill was featured in New York Times and Washington Post reports about new research that found women on YouTube receive a higher proportion of critical comments about their appearances. She also hosted the Crash Course Public Health series on YouTube.
