= BrainCraft =

YouTube educational video series

- Born: Vanessa Hill

YouTube information
- Channel: BrainCraft
- Years active: 2013–present
- Genre: Education
- Subscribers: 617 thousand
- Views: 29 million
- Last updated: May 13, 2025

BrainCraft is an educational video series on YouTube created by Australian science communicator Vanessa Hill. Hill's videos use stop motion and paper craft animation to explain neuroscience, psychology and human behavior. BrainCraft is part of the PBS Digital Studios network.

== Channel ==
BrainCraft videos are about science, with many episodes discussing phenomena related to sleep, memory, and the science of food. BrainCraft launched on 23 November 2013 with the video, Is Google Killing Your Memory? In its first few months on YouTube, BrainCraft joined PBS Digital Studios. As of March, 2020, BrainCraft has more than 500,000 subscribers and 30 million views.

Hill has collaborated with many well-known YouTubers such as Vsauce, Mike Rugnetta (PBS Idea Channel, Know Your Meme), Jake Roper (Vsauce3), Dianna Cowern (PBS Physics Girl), and more.

BrainCraft videos have been featured in Scientific American, Huffington Post, Gizmodo and MTV.

== See also ==
- Crash Course
- It's Okay to be Smart
- PBS Digital Studios
- Vsauce
