= Jason Seiken =

British-American media executive

- Citizenship: American; British
- Education: Union College; Stanford University

Jason Seiken is a British-American media executive known for launching the online edition of The Washington Post, PBS's digital output, and the Telegraph Media Group. A dual-citizen of the United States and the United Kingdom, he was the first American to run the newsroom of a major British newspaper. His brief tenure as editor-in-chief of the Daily Telegraph and Sunday Telegraph was considered controversial.

== Early life ==
Seiken attended Union College in Schenectady, NY, and later studied at Stanford University Graduate School of Business.

== Career ==
Seiken started his career as a newspaper reporter, columnist, and editor at the Schenectady Gazette (New York) and then at the Quincy Patriot Ledger (Massachusetts). In 1993, Seiken was one of 12 journalists in the United States to be awarded the John S. Knight Fellowship at Stanford University. Seiken serves on the Knight Fellowship Board of Visitors.

=== The Washington Post ===
In 1994, Seiken was hired to lead The Washington Post’s digital team and rose to become editor-in-chief of The Post’s digital subsidiary. Seiken subsequently hired and led the team that launched washingtonpost.com. At launch, the site was praised by the Philadelphia Inquirer who compared it to Michael Kinsley’s digital magazine Slate.

The Washington Post website included several industry innovations. It was the first newspaper site to update around the clock, the first to include significant non-newspaper content such as the first chapters of books, and the first to devote significant resources to creating online community that gave users a voice.

=== AOL ===
In 1997, Seiken joined AOL. In early 2001, he transferred to London to head programming for AOL UK and, later, AOL Europe.

=== PBS ===
In 2006, Seiken returned to the United States as senior vice president and general manager for digital at the Public Broadcasting Service. Under Seiken, PBS Digital launched a series of products including an iPad app, and a video platform.

During Seiken's time at PBS, the station expanded into online video content. Seiken formed PBS Digital Studios, which began producing educational but edgy videos. The studio’s first hit, an auto-tuned version of the TV classic Mister Rogers' Neighborhood, was YouTube’s 10th most viral video of 2012 having been shared 1,045,039 times. By Seiken's final year at PBS, monthly video views on PBS.org had risen from 2 million to 225 million views per month and PBS had won more 2013 Webby Awards than any other media company.

=== The Daily Telegraph ===
In October 2013, Seiken became the digital executive and editor-in-chief of The Telegraph in its London office. Seiken's appointment as a digital executive and editor was controversial. Coverage in other Fleet Street newspapers emphasized that Seiken was an American with no previous experience at British newspapers.

In early 2014, Seiken pitched his vision for the newspaper in a series of speeches to staff, which according to an online poll, some staff liked. In public speeches and interviews, Seiken said journalism was entering a “golden age” of better news gathering tools, such as databases and drones, and emerging technologies to present news, such as virtual reality. These speeches became the subject of derision in rival British newspapers, for “talking about drones" and Private Eye afforded him the name 'Psycho Seiken'.

Seiken had early success in boosting The Telegraph's web and mobile traffic, largely through clickbait. He presided over a controversial series of staff reductions and was criticized for laying off experienced print journalists.

A year after his appointment, Seiken was moved from his editorial role to a strategic role. He stepped down the following year.
