= Jay Smooth =

American writer and radio producer (born 1972)

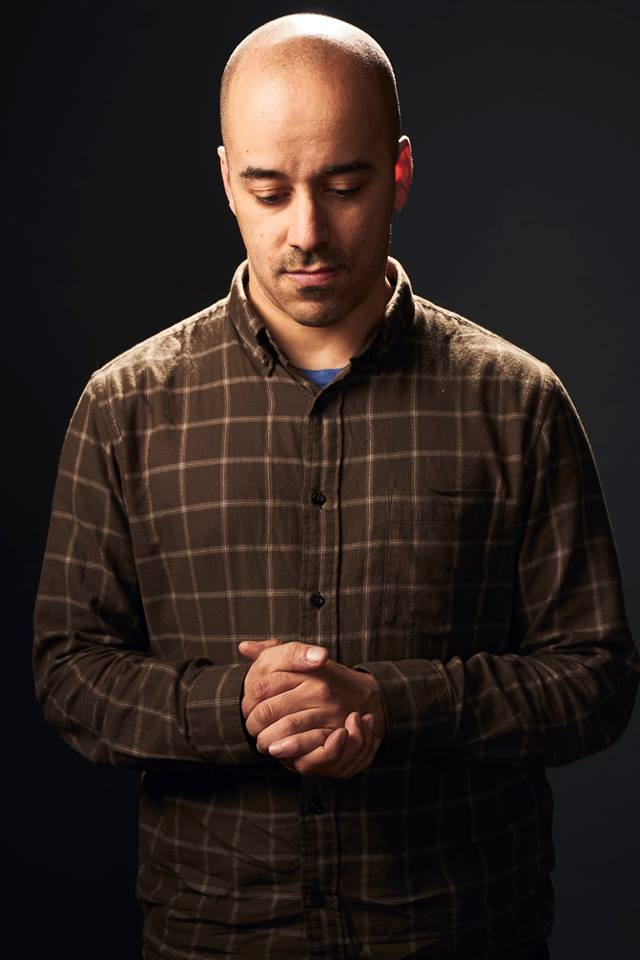
- Jay Smooth at the Giant Steps conference
- Born: John Randolph; 1972 (age 53–54); New York City, U.S.
- Occupations: Writer, DJ, radio personality, blogger

John Randolph (born 1972), better known as Jay Smooth, is an American cultural commentator best known for his Ill Doctrine video blog. He is also the founder of New York City's longest-running hip-hop radio program, WBAI's Underground Railroad. Smooth left WBAI in July 2018 after the station hired Leonard Lopate, who was fired from WNYC for allegations of sexual harassment.

== Early life ==
Smooth, the son of a Jewish mother and a black father, grew up in New York City, and attended Ethical Culture Fieldston School. He chose the pseudonym "Jay Smooth" as a teenager when he started his radio program.

== Career ==
Smooth began his career in media at 18 years old, when he founded a show called The Underground Railroad at New York's WBAI. He interviewed hip hop luminaries at a time when popular hip hop radio stations did not exist. He interviewed early hip hop stars such as TLC and The Fugees on the show. He also founded one of the world's first hip-hop websites, hiphopmusic.com.

He video blogs on a personal website called Ill Doctrine which features Smooth's commentary on hip hop, politics, and social justice, such as in "Soulja Boy Presidential Debate Remix". Smooth also occasionally provides music commentary on NPR, He rose to prominence to mainstream audiences in 2008 when he released a YouTube video on his channel called "How to Tell Somebody they Sound Racist." The video currently has nearly one and a half million views.

In 2018, he hosted a series on media literacy on the YouTube Crash Course channel. Smooth chose to leave his radio show, The Underground Railroad, in July 2018 just short of his 30th anniversary at WBAI. He stated that he quit because the station hired Leonard Lopate for a paid position shortly after Lopate was fired from WNYC for sexual misconduct.
