= Rae Wynn-Grant =

Large carnivore ecologist

- Wynn-Grant in 2017
- Born: 1985 (age 40–41); California, U.S.
- Education: Emory University (B.S.); Yale University (M.S.); Columbia University (Ph.D.)
- Occupations: Ecologist, science communicator, YouTube series host
- Website: https://www.raewynngrant.com/

Rae Wynn-Grant is an American ecologist, specializing in large carnivores. She is best known for her research on the human impact on the behavior of black bears in Montana. Wynn-Grant is a fellow of the National Geographic Society, and an advocate for women and people of color in the sciences.

== Early life and education ==
Wynn-Grant was born in California. She says that, as a child, she spent time watching television programs about wildlife and conservation, which inspired her interest in ecology.

Wynn-Grant received her B.S. in Environmental Studies from Emory University and her M.S. in Environmental Studies from The Yale School of the Environment at Yale University, and her Ph.D. in Ecology and Evolution from Columbia University. She also completed a Conservation Science Research and Teaching Postdoctoral Fellowship with the Center for Biodiversity and Conservation at the American Museum of Natural History.

== Career ==
Wynn-Grant is an ecologist, storyteller, and science communicator. She is a current research fellow with National Geographic Society. She also serves as a visiting scientist position at the American Museum of Natural History and an adjunct professor at Columbia University and Johns Hopkins University. Dr. Wynn-Grant was a staff member at "Bren School of Environmental Science", was in management at "University of California at Santa Barbara" and she serves on the board at the "Golden Gate regional board of NatureBridge"

=== Research ===
Wynn-Grant studies large carnivores with a focus on using statistical modeling to determine how human activity alters the spatial patterns of carnivore behavior and ecology. As a National Geographic Society fellow, she worked with the American Prairie to predict which human habitats will attract bears as part of the reserve's restoration efforts in northeast Montana. Wynn-Grant used camera traps, geographic information systems and other research methods to study the movements of bears to better understand their habitat preferences and risk of being struck by vehicles or euthanized by local authorities. In 2021 she co-wrote an article "Mapping and modeling human-black bear interactions in the Catskills region of New York using resource selection probability functions."

=== Other activities ===
From April to July 2021, Wynn-Grant hosted Crash Course Zoology, a fourteen-episode series on YouTube which focuses on different aspects of animal biology. In 2021, she was a collaborator for the Reebok x National Geographic collection of family-friendly shoes, alongside photographer Matthieu Paley. She is the host and writer on the podcast series, Going Wild with Dr. Rae Wynn-Grant by PBS Nature, which was honored in 2022 by the Webby Awards for Best Limited Series.

== Notable publications ==
- Rae Wynn-Grant, Joshua R. Ginsberg, Carl W. Lackey, Eleanor J. Sterling, Jon P. Beckmann, Risky business: Modeling mortality risk near the urban-wildland interface for a large carnivore, Global Ecology and Conservation, Volume 16, 2018, e00443, ISSN 2351-9894, .
- Wynn-Grant, Rae Jackson (2015). Using Anthropogenic Parameters at Multiple Scales to Inform Conservation and Management of a Large Carnivore (Thesis). Columbia University. doi:10.7916/d8d50mm0.
- Wynn-Grant, R. 2019. On reporting scientific and racial history. Science. 20 Sep 2019: Vol. 365, Issue 6459, pp. 1256-1257 DOI: 10.1126/science.aay2459
- Peth, Darcy. Hoyle, Jennifer. Alcott, Emily. Siegal, Jessica. Kamal, Shristi. Wynn-Grant, Rae. (2015) The Greater Yellowstone Ecosystem: A Rapid Appraisal and Recommendations. In: Clark S., Hohl A., Picard C., Thomas E. (eds) Large-Scale Conservation in the Common Interest. Springer Series on Environmental Management. Springer, Cham.

== Advocacy efforts ==
Wynn-Grant, who is African-American, is an advocate for women and people of color in the sciences. In 2019, the American Association for the Advancement of Science named her one of 100 IF/THEN Ambassadors, a program designed to highlight women in science, technology, engineering and mathematics fields to create high-profile role models for middle school girls. Wynn-Grant also serves as Equity, Inclusion, and Diversity Officer on the Board of Governors for the Society for Conservation Biology.

Wynn-Grant is committed to raising awareness of racism and equity in the sciences. In September 2019, she wrote a response to Sam Kean's feature, "Science's debt to the slave trade," in Science. Wynn-Grant criticized Kean's article for centering the motivations and work of white scientists in discussing the slave trade while including little on how Black people experienced the violence of slavery and how its legacy has influenced the participation of Black people in the sciences today.

Wynn-Grant also serves on the board of directors for The Explorer's Club.
