= Greater Manchester Baccalaureate =

Educational framework in England

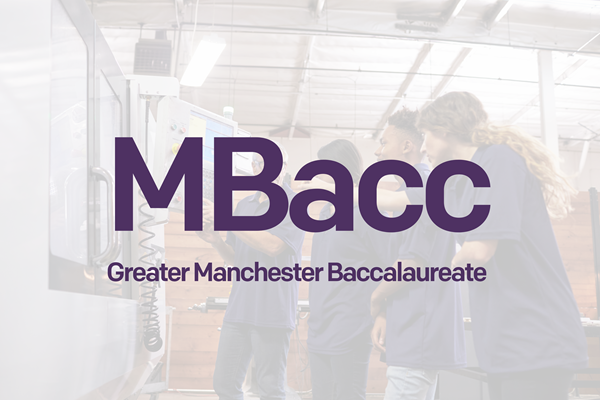
- Abbreviation: MBacc
- Formation: September 2024
- Headquarters: Manchester, England
- Parent organisation: Greater Manchester Combined Authority

The Greater Manchester Baccalaureate (MBacc) is an educational framework created and implemented by the Greater Manchester Combined Authority. Touted as an alternative to the university route, the system aims to connect young people to sectors through technical education, for eventual employment in industries key to the regional economy. It aims to be fully operational across the combined authority by 2030.

== History ==
=== Formation ===
In 2022 the Mayor of Greater Manchester, Andy Burnham, announced his intention to create a baccalaureate to promote technical education to the city region's young people. Upon his third re-election as mayor, Burnham committed to give "everyone who grows up [in Greater Manchester] an equal alternative to the university route so all our young people have a path in life and hope in their heart".

In late 2024, Angela Rayner, the then-Secretary of State for Housing, Communities and Local Government, gave Burnham the power and funding to deliver the first stages of the baccalaureate.

=== Implementation ===
A 'powerhouse network' of businesses based in Greater Manchester was established to bring workplace experiences and webinars to thousands of students across 33 schools. The scheme worked with the Raspberry Pi Foundation to create a Certificate in Applied Computing, which will ensure that students have the necessary fundamental digital skills for the digital pathway. A new digital platform, Beeline, allows MBacc participants to explore the seven pathways as well as view live job opportunities. As of September 2024, the platform has 4,500 users. An MBacc Educator Panel was established to ensure that the baccalaureate is "being proactively and strategically shaped by... the needs of the education system".

Burnham's commitment to a system "for young people, by young people" led to the creation of Young Ambassadors, in order to reflect the hopes and frustrations of the participants of the scheme.

By 2024, more than 650 new 45-day placements had been created by local employers as part of the MBacc, including many businesses and institutions which have never offered placements before, such as midwifery work experiences at the Northern Care Alliance NHS Trust.

A pledge from local public transport provider Transport for Greater Manchester, national public transport regulator Network Rail and a number of other train operating companies saw 160 MBacc placements and apprenticeships created, across engineering, operations and project management pathways.

Greater Manchester in England

== Organisation ==
At 14, students must choose which subjects to study to GCSE level. The MBacc fulfils a similar function to the English Baccalaureate (EBacc), in that it is a guide to help students in their choice, based on subjects which good universities consider necessary. Within the MBacc, seven job pathways exist, which correspond to the subjects and qualifications desired most by employers in each industry:

- Construction and the Green Economy
- Creative, Culture and Sport
- Digital and Technology
- Education and Early Years
- Engineering and Manufacturing
- Financial and Professional
- Health and Social Care

English language and literature, maths, sciences and digital skills are 'core qualifications' and part of every pathway.

At 16, young people on the MBacc route will embark on T Levels, a vocational-based qualification, of which there will eventually be far more, including continued access to MBacc-backed placements and other technical qualifications.

At 18, young people will then have access to 'more prestigious' work-related courses, including degree apprenticeships.
