= J. Clarke Richardson Collegiate =

Location
- 1355 Harwood Ave North; Ajax, Ontario, L1T 4G8; Canada; 43°53′1″N 79°1′38″W

Information
- School type: Public Secondary School
- Motto: Commit. Learn. Thrive
- Founded: 2002
- School board: Durham District School Board
- Superintendent: Patrice Barnes
- Area trustee: Patrice Barnes
- Principal: Jennifer Fletcher
- Grades: 9 - 12
- Enrolment: 1750 (2019/2020)
- Language: English
- Colours: Black, Silver and White
- Mascot: Lightning Bolt
- Team name: Richardson Storm
- Feeder schools: Applecroft PS, Da Vinci PS, Dr. Roberta Bondar PS, Lester B. Pearson PS, Lord Elgin PS, Nottingham PS, Romeo Dallaire PS, Terry Fox PS, Valleyview PS

J. Clarke Richardson Collegiate is a secondary school in Ajax, Ontario, Canada. J. Clarke Richardson is run under the Durham District School Board. Richardson offers a wide range of academic and co-curricular activities for students, such as the enriched specialist high skills major programs in the Arts & Culture, Construction, Hospitality & Tourism, Information & Communication Technology, Sports and Transportation.

Richardson Collegiate developed the first laptop program in DDSB and continues to be a leading school in technology.

Academic co-curricular activities include: Art, Breakfast club, Chess, Coders in Action, Computer Engineering, Concert Band, Dance team, Debate team, DECA, Dungeons & Dragons, Eco club, English Language Help (MLL) club, English Society, Eye on the Storm (school newspaper), Feminist Society, Fashion, French, Girls Who Code, GSA, Henna, HOSA, Gaming, STEM, Jazz, Smiles 4 Seniors, Wellness Lounge, Key Club, Knit & Crochet, Model United Nations, Photography, Robotics, Choir, Reach for the Top Trivia, Shark Tank, Sign Language, Space, Students Without Boarders, Global Voices, TechXplores, White Pine Reading, World Issues, Social Media team, SAFE schools team, Speech and Debate, Kelly Cup Mock Trial team, DELF French club, and Best Buddies of Richardson.

Leadership co-curricular activities include Super Storm Council, Student Government, Richardson Athletic Council, Art Council, Drama Council, Music Council, Afghan Student Association, Black Student Association, DESI Student Association, East Asian Student Association, Hindu Student Association, IMPACT Christian Club, Indian Student Association, Muslim Student Association, Pakistani Student Association, Tamil Student Association, and Cultures of Richardson.

== Name ==
The school's name originates from James Clarke Richardson, a well known local educator. He was the principal at Pickering High School (Ajax) from 1958 to 1964, Superintendent of the Pickering secondary schools starting in 1964, and the Superintendent of Operations for the new Ontario county board in 1969, which included all of the Ajax high schools. Richardson was well respected by colleagues and students and was key in making it possible for students to further their education by helping financially.

== Building ==
J. Clarke Richardson Collegiate was opened in September 2002. It is a part of a project that combines two high schools, J. Clarke of the Durham District School Board and Notre Dame Catholic Secondary of the Durham Catholic District School Board. The schools are separated by a shared cafeteria and theatre on the inside, directly in the middle of both schools. It also shares a main sports field east of the building, all of which is on the same property. J. Clarke occupies the south half of the complex and Notre Dame (ND) occupies the north half. J. Clarke owns a state-of-the-art kitchen for its culinary program.

== Sports and Teams ==
Athletic co-curricular activities include basketball, soccer, ice hockey, football, volleyball, track and field, field hockey, badminton, tennis, baseball and cross-country running. The Cricket team won the Mayor's Cup in 2025 and was ranked the top high school Cricket team in the Province. The Richardson teams are known as the Richardson Storm.

In recent years, J Clarke Richardson has become known as a dominant basketball school and have consistently been ranked in the top 10 basketball schools in the GTA. They have participated in back-to-back LOSSA championships in 2010 and 2011, one of which they won. They competed the OFSAA basketball tournament in the years 2010 and 2011 respectively. In 2011, they finished fourth in OFSAA. In 2010, J. Clarke's basketball was once ranked number 1 in the GTA and all of Canada. In 2026 they were declared LOSSA co-champions with Pickering High School and competed in OFSAA.

Unified Sport is an important part of the Richardson culture. The school is one of seven schools across the Province to be awarded the All School Banner for Unified Sport. The All School Banner honours schools who have demonstrated excellence in Inclusion by achieving eight or more initiatives in the areas of Inclusive Sports & Health, Youth Leadership and Whole School Engagement. In 2025 three athletes and one alumni from Richardson were selected to play for Team Canada in the 3X3 World Basketball Games in Puerto Rico. The girls' team placed fourth and the boys' team won bronze in these World Championships.

The school has also done well in track and field, particularly in the 100 m sprinting, in which they hold the senior boys record in Central Ontario with a time of 10.73 s (2011).

The 2014 robotics won regional competition GTR west and progressed to the world robotics championship in St.Louis, Missouri. In 2026 the Robotics team qualified for the Canada Cup, which is an International event that hosts teams from around the world. Richardson is a leader in robotics in the Ajax area with as the teams work to support the development of elementary school teams through mentorship, sharing of robotics materials and hosting robotics events.

In 2026, Richardson won Outstanding Production in the National Theatre School's Durham Regional Drama Festival. They were invited to perform in the Eastern Showcase to be held at Queen's University. This winning production was written collectively by the Richardson drama students and staff.

J. Clarke has also sent an alumnus to the United States on Division 1 NCAA soccer scholarships.

The NFL's New York Jets Nathan Shepherd, was the only Canadian 2018 NFL draft pick and graduate of J Clarke Richardson.

== Other ==
J. Clarke Richardson is an award winner for their technology education an integration program. From its inception, JCR has implemented information literacy skills across its curriculum program. The goals of the ICT programs are to ensure that technology is used to improve student learning and to guarantee that all students graduate high school with the basics about how to use technology. J Clarke's EcoTeam has created and fund-raised for the production of an outdoor classroom. This classroom provides an opportunity for students to learn and engage in hands-on activities. This space is available for all classes, in all of the subjects, and depending on the subject there are many different activities.

JCR's main feeder schools are:

- Applecroft Public School
- DaVinci Public School
- Dr. Roberta Bondar Public School
- Lester B. Pearson Public School
- Nottingham Public School
- Romeo Dallaire Public School
- Terry Fox Public School
- Valley View Public School
- Viola Desmond Public School

JCR's overflow feeder schools are:

- Lincoln Alexander Public School
- Westney Heights Public School

== See also ==
- Education in Ontario
- List of secondary schools in Ontario
