= Bebras Competition =

Computer science competition

The International Bebras Challenge on Informatics is an annual computer science competition for primary and secondary school students around the world. It is the largest computer science competition in the world.

== Format ==
The Bebras is a 45-minute multiple-choice test with 15 problems. The problems are divided into three pairs of 5, and classified as "easy", "medium" and "hard". In most countries, the competition is administered through a web system that automatically scores each participant's work. The pool of Bebras problems is agreed upon during the annual international "Bebras Task Workshop" by the representatives of all member countries.

== History ==
Originally founded by the University of Vilnius and first administered in Lithuania in 2004, the Bebras competition is named after Lithuanian word "Bebras" which translates to "beaver". The competition has been subject of research and several dozen publications.

In 2015, the Bebras organization was awarded the Microsoft-sponsored "Best Practices in Education Award" by Informatics Europe. In 2019 Google awarded Bebras Indonesia a $1 million grant to support the program and further train teachers in the field of computer science.

By 2022, there were two and a half million global participants.

== Bebras in the United Kingdom ==
The "UK Bebras Challenge" is organised by the Raspberry Pi Foundation in the United Kingdom. In 2024 the challenge was taken by 467,190 young people across the UK.

== Members ==
=== Full members ===
- Algeria
- Argentina
- Armenia
- Australia
- Austria
- Azerbaijan
- Belarus (suspended in April 2022)
- Belgium
- Bosnia and Herzegovina
- Brazil
- Bulgaria
- Canada
- China
- Colombia
- Croatia
- Cyprus
- Czech Republic
- Egypt
- Estonia
- Finland
- France
- Germany
- Greece
- Hungary
- Iceland
- India
- Indonesia
- Iran
- Ireland
- Italy
- Jamaica
- Japan
- Latvia
- Lithuania
- Malaysia
- Mexico
- Montenegro
- Netherlands
- New Zealand
- North Macedonia
- Pakistan
- Paraguay
- Philippines
- Poland
- Portugal
- Puerto Rico
- Romania
- Russia (suspended in April 2022)
- Saudi Arabia
- Serbia
- Singapore
- Slovakia
- Slovenia
- South Africa
- South Korea
- Spain
- Sweden
- Switzerland
- Syria
- Taiwan
- Thailand
- Turkey
- Ukraine
- United Kingdom
- United States
- Uruguay
- Uzbekistan
- Vietnam

=== Provisional members ===
- Afghanistan
- Bolivia
- Botswana
- Cameroon
- Costa Rica
- Denmark
- Dominican Republic
- Ecuador
- Ghana
- Hong Kong
- Kazakhstan
- Kosovo
- Libya
- Luxembourg
- Macau
- Malta
- Mongolia
- Myanmar
- Namibia
- Norway
- Palestine
- Peru
- Sri Lanka
- Tanzania
