= Sabrina Cruz =

Canadian YouTuber (born 1998)

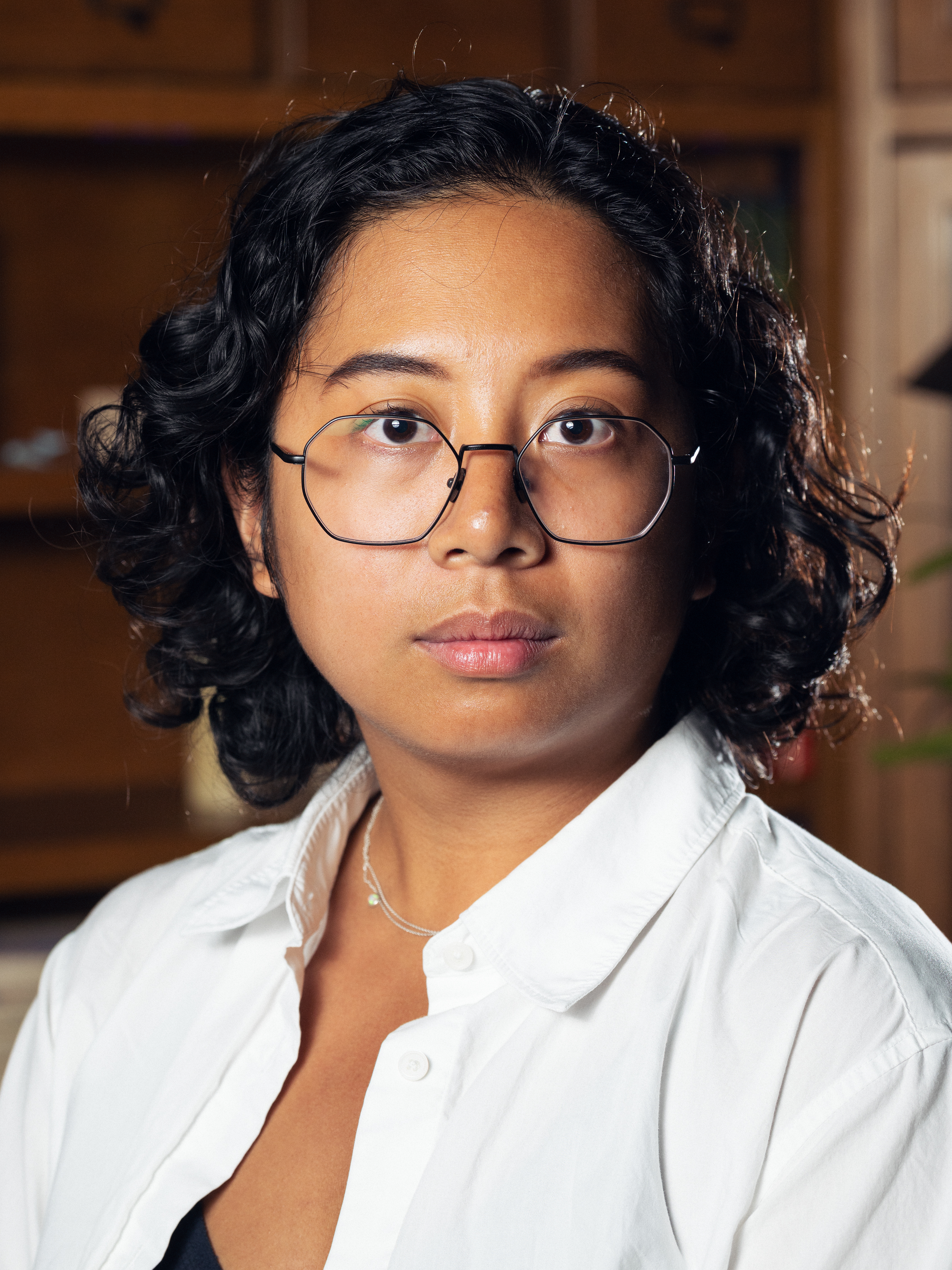
- Cruz in 2026
- Born: 22 April 1998 (age 28); Toronto, Ontario, Canada
- Education: Notre Dame Catholic Secondary School; University of Toronto

YouTube information
- Channel: Answer in Progress
- Years active: 2012–present
- Genres: Educational; Vlog
- Subscribers: 1.68 million
- Views: 111 million
- Last updated: 17 June 2026
- Website: sabrinacruz.ca

Sabrina Cruz (born 22 April 1998) is a Canadian YouTuber best known for her educational YouTube videos on her main channel, Answer in Progress, formerly known as NerdyAndQuirky, which she launched on 6 January 2012. As of November 2024, the channel has 1.6 million subscribers and 95.7 million views. She also hosted Crash Course Kids, the children-oriented version of the educational YouTube series Crash Course.

Originally from Toronto, Ontario, she graduated from Notre Dame Catholic Secondary School in Ajax. She posted her first video on YouTube when she was in 7th grade; the now-deleted video depicted her eating a cookie. In October 2016, she was a first-year undergraduate at the University of Toronto's Innis College, Toronto, from which she received a Schulich Leader Scholarship in that year. She studied mathematics at the University of Toronto. She spoke at one panel at the 2015 VidCon, where she also moderated another panel. In 2017 Cruz was nominated in the Breakout YouTuber category at the 9th Shorty Awards.

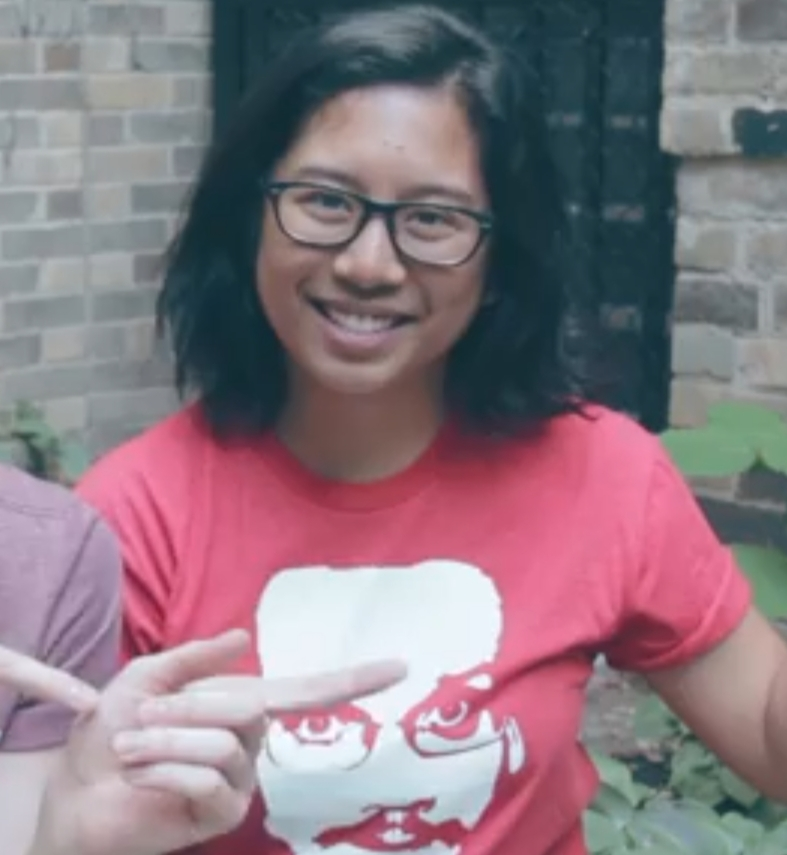
Cruz in 2014

In 2020, she graduated from the university with a bachelor's degree in math, economics and statistics, and along with Taha Khan and Melissa Fernandes, she started Answer In Progress, a digital media project funded by the Super Patron Creator Arts grant.
