= Samuel Ramsey =

American entomologist

- Other names: Dr. Sammy, Your Friendly Neighborhood Entomologist, Dr. Buggs
- Education: Cornell University (BS) University of Maryland (PhD)
- Awards: University of Maryland Research Award National Geographic Wayfinder Award Lowell Thomas Award
- Scientific career
- Fields: Entomology, ecology, evolutionary biology
- Workplaces: University of Colorado
- Academic advisors: Dennis vanEngelsdorp
- Website: drsammy.online

Samuel D. Ramsey is an American entomologist.

== Early life and education ==
Samuel Ramsey grew up in the Washington D.C. area. His parents were pastors. Ramsey was afraid of insects as a young child, but developed an interest in them when he was seven after reading books about insects at his local library.

He graduated from Cornell University with a Bachelor of Science in entomology in 2011, and received his PhD from the University of Maryland College Park in 2018. He was a student of Dennis vanEngelsdorp during his time there.

== Career ==
Ramsey specializes in the study of Varroa destructor, the most significant cause of health decline in honey bee populations worldwide. For decades, researchers assumed the mites fed on the hemolymph of the honey bee, but Ramsey's research revealed that the mites were feeding on the honey bee's fat body tissue, which explained why pesticides were unsuccessful in killing the mites.

Ramsey has also collaborated with researchers at Burapha University in Thailand to study Tropilaelaps mites, a significant threat to honey bee populations across Asia.

Ramsey hosted the English language 2023 updated Crash Course Biology video series, in collaboration with Howard Hughes Medical Institute Biointeractive. Ramsey was the scientific expert in National Geographic's 2026 docu-series Secrets of the Bees.

Ramsey operates a nonprofit called the Ramsey Research Foundation, which "conduct[s] novel research on issues affecting pollinator health...operat[es] advanced pollinator research facilities...[and] find[s] sustainable solutions to complex issues enabling pollinators and people to co-exist and thrive". Ramsey is a professor of ecology and evolutionary biology at the University of Colorado Boulder. He also works at the United States Department of Agriculture.

== Awards and honors ==
In 2017, while attending the University of Maryland, Ramsey won both Judge's First Place and the People's Choice award in the Three Minute Thesis contest, sponsored by Universitas 21. The same year, he received the American Association of Professional Apiculturists Student Competition Award. In 2021, Ramsey received the University of Maryland Research Award for his work studying Varroa destructor. In 2022, Ramsey was named a National Geographic Explorer. The same year, he received the National Geographic Wayfinder Award. In 2024, he received the Lowell Thomas Award.

== Personal life ==
Ramsey is Christian and queer.
