= Notre Dame Catholic Secondary School (Ajax) =

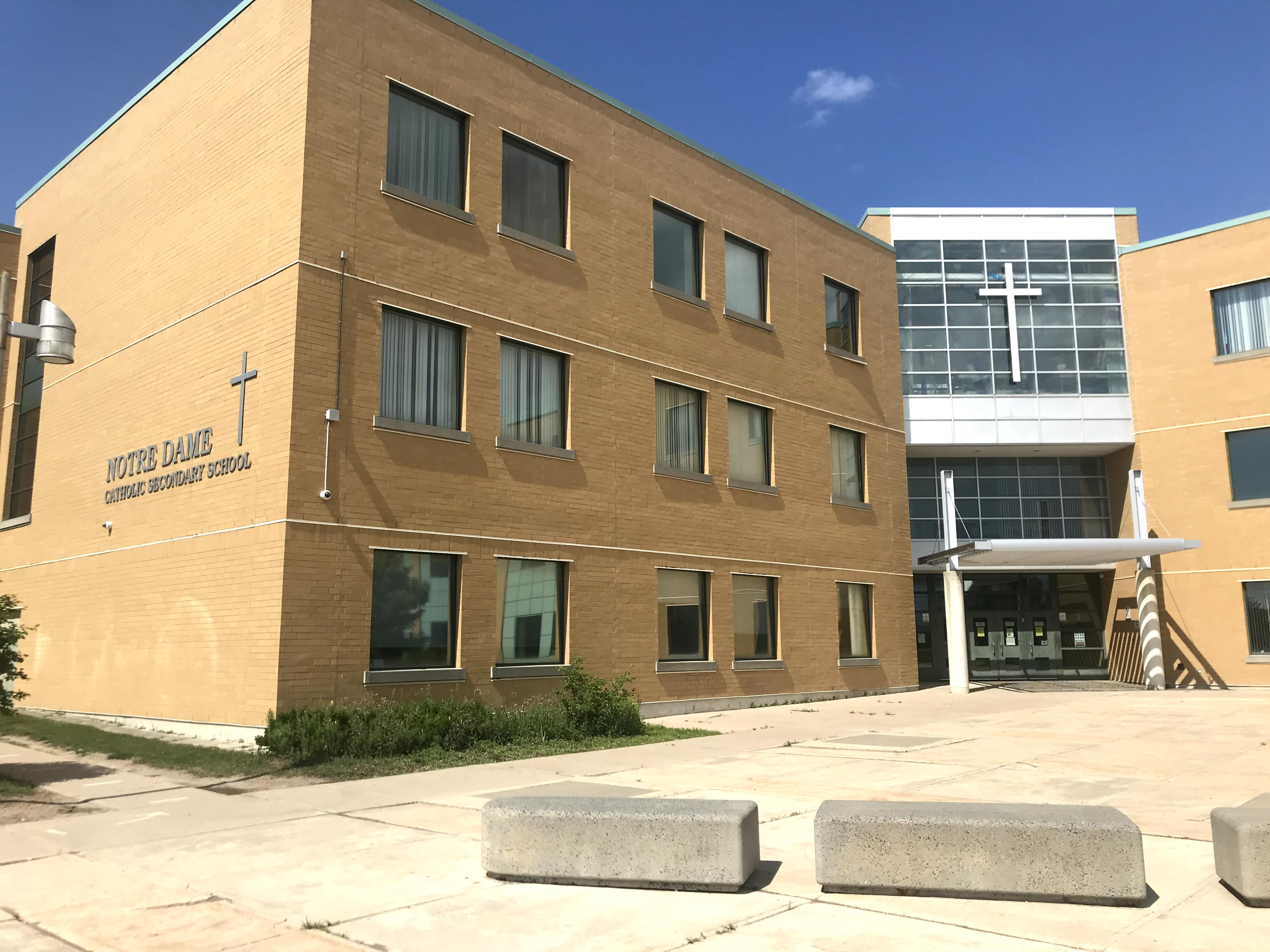

Location
- 1375 Harwood Avenue North; Ajax, Ontario, L1T 4G8; Canada; 43.8847°N 79.0278°W

Information
- School type: Catholic High School
- Motto: Caritas, Sapientia, Concordia (Charity, Wisdom, Harmony)
- Founded: 2001
- School board: Durham Catholic District School Board
- Principal: Shawnn O’Connor
- Grades: 9–12
- Enrolment: 1,100 (2019/2020)
- Language: English and French
- Colours: █ █ Purple and Grey
- Mascot: Cougars
- Website: http://notredame.dcdsb.ca/

Notre Dame Catholic Secondary School is a high school located in Ajax, Ontario, Canada. It was opened in 2001 along with its twin school J. Clarke Richardson Collegiate. Notre Dame and Richardson share the same building, with Notre Dame occupying the north wing and Richardson the south. The cafeteria is the physical divider between the two high schools and is shared by both, along with the theatre and the football field. The layouts of Notre Dame and Richardson are essentially identical except for a few minor differences in the shop classrooms and the gymnasiums.

== History ==
The school was opened in September 2001 as the second Catholic high school in Ajax. It was opened along with J. Clarke Richardson as a "mega school"—a Catholic high school and a public high school sharing the same building. Notre Dame was built amidst a large amount of suburban development, which contributes much of the student body. Since the opening of the school, there has been a lot of residential and commercial development in the area.

== Feeder schools ==
The school's students generally come from the following Catholic elementary schools:

- St. Andre Bessette Catholic School
- St. Teresa of Calcutta Catholic School
- St. Catherine of Siena Catholic School
- St. Patrick Catholic School
- St. Josephine Bakhita Catholic School

== Notable alumni ==
- Jessica Tyler – Actress, Singer
- Sabrina Cruz – YouTuber
- Dayne St. Clair – Soccer player
- Connor McMichael – Hockey Player
- Duan Asemota – Olympian, Track & Field athlete

== See also ==
- Education in Ontario
- List of secondary schools in Ontario
