= TechKnow =

- Title card
- Created by: Al Jazeera America
- Presented by: Phil Torres and others
- Country of origin: United States

Production
- Production locations: Los Angeles and on location.
- Running time: 30 minutes

Original release
- Network: Al Jazeera English; Al Jazeera America (2013–2016); Al Jazeera Balkans (2011–present)
- Release: August 25, 2013 – December 2017

TechKnow is a 30-minute news program on the Al Jazeera English and, formerly, Al Jazeera America networks. The show ran from April 2014 until December 2017, profiling advances and inventions in the areas of science, technology and medicine. The series was hosted by an ensemble, notably led by science communicators Phil Torres, Shini Somara, Cara Santa Maria. The show was created by executive producers Steve Lange and Roland Woerner of the Los Angeles–based Make Fresh Productions.

The show's main setting is Republic of Pie in North Hollywood, California. Present program on the Al Jazeera Balkans networks.
