= Cara Santa Maria =

American science communicator and podcaster (born 1983)

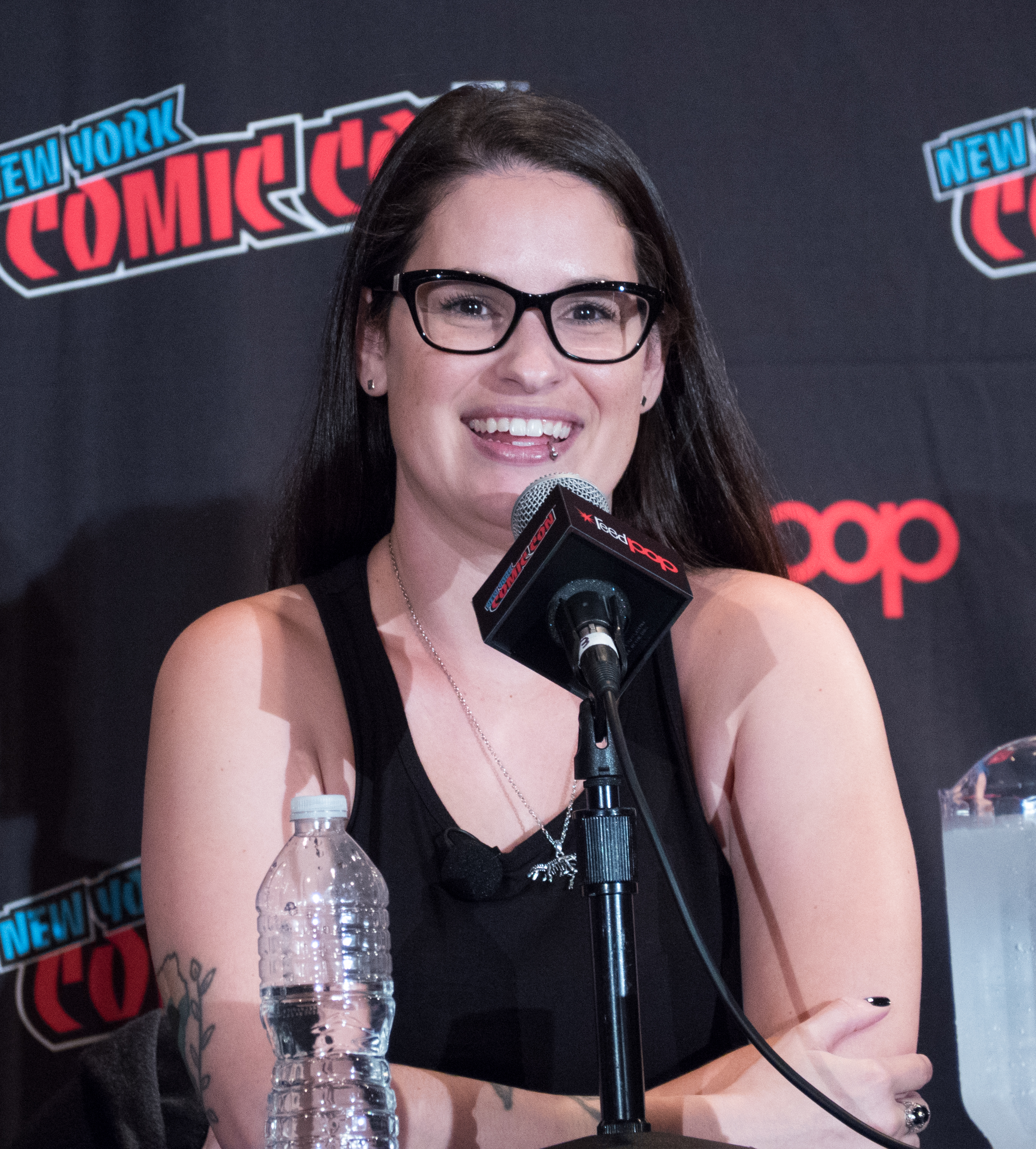
- At New York ComicCon in 2018
- Born: Cara Louise Santa Maria; October 19, 1983 (age 43); Plano, Texas, U.S.
- Education: University of North Texas (BS, MS); Fielding Graduate University (PhD)
- Occupations: Science communicator, producer, journalist, podcaster, television host, neuroscientist
- Cara Santa Maria's voice Recorded October 2016

Cara Louise Santa Maria (born October 19, 1983) is an American science communicator. She hosts the podcast Talk Nerdy and co-hosts The Skeptics' Guide to the Universe podcast, and was a co-host of TechKnow on Al Jazeera America.

Santa Maria wrote her first blog for The Huffington Post in March 2010 before joining the publication as its founding science correspondent and host of the Talk Nerdy to Me web series from October 2011 until April 2013. She also co-hosted Take Part Live with Jacob Soboroff on Pivot TV. She officially joined the online political and social commentary program The Young Turks as an occasional panelist in May 2013. She was a guest on the TV series Brain Games.

== Early life and education ==
Santa Maria was born and raised in Plano, Texas, the younger of two daughters. Her parents, a school teacher and an engineer, both came from Catholic families and converted to Mormonism together as adults, raising their children in the religion, and for a while Santa Maria attended church daily before classes. Years after her parents divorced, she left the LDS church at 15 and came out as an atheist. Her ancestry is Puerto Rican on her mother's side.

Santa Maria was a vocal jazz performer and auditioned for the second season of American Idol, but was not selected. She then decided to pursue psychology. In 2004, she earned a Bachelor of Science degree in psychology with a minor in philosophy from the University of North Texas, going on to earn a Master of Science in biological science, with a concentration in neuroscience, from her alma mater in 2007.

Santa Maria taught biology and psychology courses to university undergraduates as well as high school students in Texas and New York. Her published research has spanned various topics, including clinical psychological assessment, the neuropsychology of blindness, neuronal cell culture techniques, and computational neurophysiology. Santa Maria was enrolled in a doctoral program studying clinical neuropsychology at Queens College, CUNY, where she worked as an adjunct professor and laboratory researcher, but withdrew after a year of coursework to pursue science communication full-time.

In 2004, Santa Maria won the Texas Psychological Association and Texas Psychology Foundation's Alexander Psychobiology/Psychophysiology Award (Student Merit Research Competition) for contributions in undergraduate research concerning neuropsychological deficits among individuals with alcohol dependence or abuse in a visually impaired/blind population. In the clinical neuropsychological setting, Santa Maria assisted in development and research of computer adapted guides for educational management of students with both neuropsychological dysfunction and visual impairment.

In a 2013 interview in Skeptical Inquirer, when asked how she became interested in science, Santa Maria said:

It's funny, because when I was really, really young, I was obsessed with dinosaurs, and I would try to dig up dinosaur bones in my backyard. As a kindergartner, I was sure that I was going to grow up to become a paleontologist. Cut to high school, when I was scared out of my mind of science and avoided science like the plague, and I don't think that I was really well-prepared for that dream. I found out later that you have to study rocks and dirt and all sorts of things that I didn't care about. So I ended up actually studying psychology in college, after making a switch from vocal jazz performance – a random, winding road! It wasn't until I got really into psychology that I realized how fascinating the brain part of the equation, and the brain-behavior relationship, was. So I decided to stick around after I got my undergrad and study biology – specifically neuroscience – for my master's degree.

As of January 2019, Santa Maria was working toward a Ph.D. in Clinical Psychology with a concentration in Social Justice and Diversity from Fielding Graduate University.

== Career ==
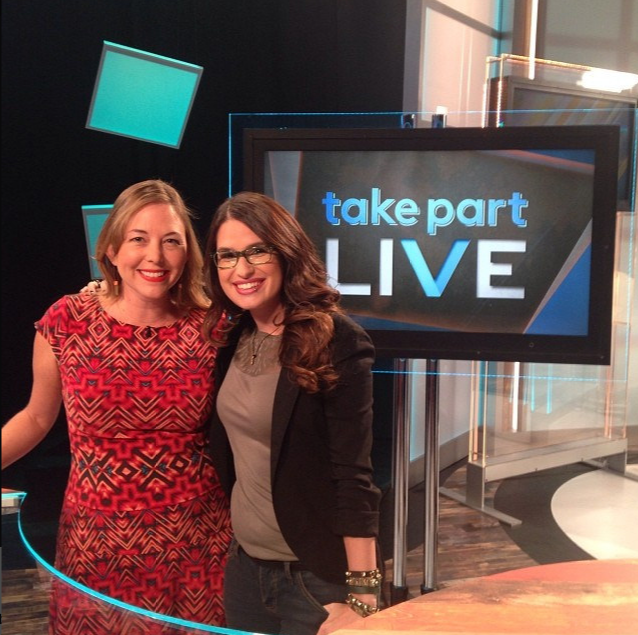
Take Part Live co-host Cara Santa Maria with guest, Alissa Walker.

In 2009, Santa Maria moved to the Los Angeles area to begin a career in science communication, after previously having worked in academia. She co-produced and hosted a pilot entitled Talk Nerdy to Me for HBO, but it never went to air. Santa Maria has appeared on various programs including Larry King Live, Geraldo at Large (Fox News), Parker Spitzer (CNN), Studio 11, The Young Turks, Attack of the Show!, The War Room with Jennifer Granholm, LatiNation, and SoCal Connected.

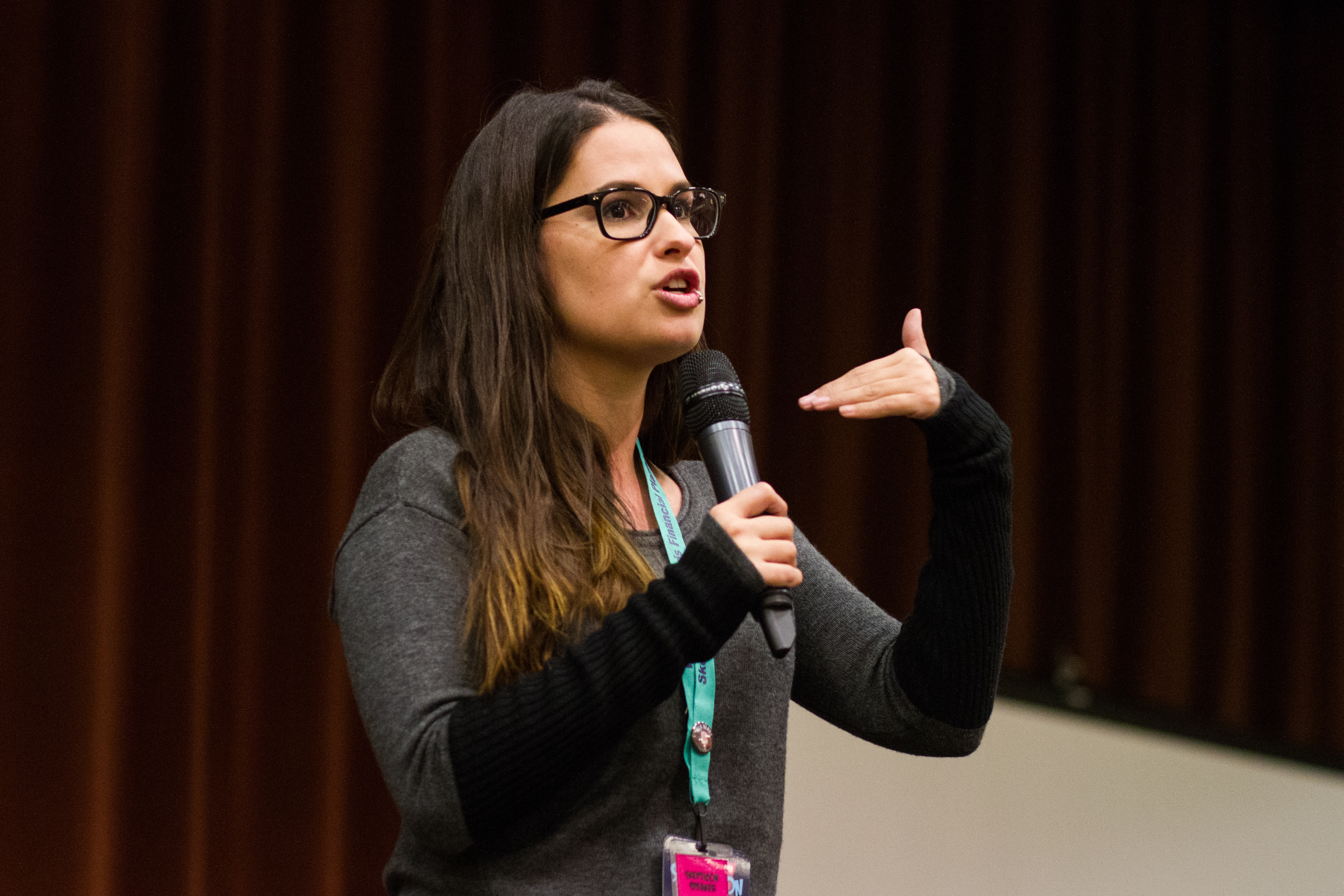
Cara Santa Maria at Skepticon in November 2014.

Santa Maria has co-hosted Hacking the Planet and The Truth About Twisters on The Weather Channel, as well as TechKnow on Al Jazeera America. She is a former host of Take Part Live on the Pivot (TV channel).

She makes regular appearances on popular YouTube programs, such as Stan Lee's FanWars, Wil Wheaton's Tabletop, and The Point. She has also guested on multiple podcasts, such as The Nerdist Podcast, Point of Inquiry, Star Talk, God Awful Movies and the Joe Rogan Experience. Speaking with Chris Mooney on Point of Inquiry in 2012, Santa Maria recognized that her work on behalf of science can sometimes be polarizing, and said that she tries “to write with a lot of respect and reverence for people's ideas.”

Santa Maria has been interviewed by Scientific American, The Times of London, Columbia Journalism Review, and Glamour.

In March 2014, Santa Maria debuted her weekly podcast entitled Talk Nerdy. New episodes premiere every Monday and guests typically revolve around those involved in STEM fields, however individuals with careers oriented in new media and pop culture also make appearances. Additionally, atheism and politics are popular topics of conversation.

Santa Maria wrote the foreword of atheism activist David Silverman's book, Fighting God: An Atheist Manifesto for a Religious World, published in December 2015.

On July 18, 2015, during the live taping of episode 524 of The Skeptics' Guide to the Universe (SGU) podcast at The Amaz!ng Meeting, it was announced that Santa Maria would be joining the podcast, and she joined the other SGU members to record her first show as a regular member of their team.

In July 2015, Santa Maria was named a correspondent on "Real Future" for Fusion.

In 2016, Santa Maria hosted on-line video segments that accompany the reality TV show America's Greatest Makers.

In 2017, Santa Maria was a guest panelist on the Netflix series Bill Nye Saves the World.

=== Professional awards ===
- 2014: Knight Innovation Give Forward Award, presented by Neil deGrasse Tyson for Santa Maria's efforts to make science clearer for a broad public audience.
- 2015: 67th Los Angeles Area Emmy Award for feature segment: Natural History Museum's Citizen Science Insect Labeling Project
- 2016: 68th Los Angeles Area Emmy Award for Information/Public Affairs Series (Greater than 50% remote): SoCal Connected.
- 2016: 66th Annual Golden Mike Award
- 2017: 69th Los Angeles Area Emmy Award for Information/Public Affairs Series (Greater than 50% remote): SoCal Connected

== Personal life ==
From 2009 to 2011, Cara Santa Maria was in a relationship with television host and political commentator Bill Maher.

She has been open about her struggles with major depressive disorder. In a Point of Inquiry podcast interview, Santa Maria said that she is takes antidepressants daily and that psychotherapy has made a huge improvement in her mental health.

== Bibliography ==
Along with her co-hosts on The Skeptics' Guide to the Universe podcast, Santa Maria co-authored a book, published in 2018, about scientific skepticism: The Skeptics' Guide to the Universe: How to Know What's Really Real in a World Increasingly Full of Fake."
