= TakePart =

TakePart, LLC
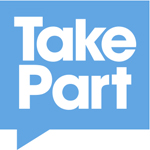
- Type: Digital media company
- Founded: 2008
- Headquarters: Los Angeles, California, U.S.
- Parent: Participant Media

TakePart was a website operated by Participant Media, a motion picture studio that focuses on issues of social justice. TakePart was founded in 2008 to promote Participant Media's films as well as make viewers aware of the social advocacy efforts of Participant's outreach partners. The operation has shut down.

== About the site ==
TakePart produced a website with a daily cycle of original articles, blogs, and videos on the culture and lifestyle of change. Topics of coverage included animals, arts, food, education, the environment, green tech, politics, culture, health and innovation. The site also provided ways for users to take action on the issues they read about. TakePart also offered services including custom content creation and campaign building to NGOs and brands looking to create social impact.

One of TakePart's first media campaigns to win public notice was its activism about the 2008 semi-documentary film, Chicago 10.

In 2009, TakePart released GiveABit, an iPhone application which solicits charitable donations for Participant Media's nonprofit advocacy partners from iPhone users once a day. In 2011, advertising executive Chad Boettcher was hired by Participant Media to oversee an expanded social action outreach via the TakePart Web site.

The TakePart.com website was a major aspect of the marketing campaign for the 2011 motion picture Contagion. By year's end, more than 2 million people had visited the TakePart Contagion page.

At the end of 2016 Participant Media merged TakePart's studio operations into its own and shut down its website as part of a strategic move.

== TakePart Live ==
On August 1, 2013 Pivot TV aired the first episode of TakePart Live a live show hosted by Cara Santa Maria and Jacob Soboroff that covered news, social media, current events and is a component to the website.

In January 2014, popular comedian personality Tehran Von Ghasri was added to the permanent live show roster as host adding color commentary, academic and worldly perspective. In April 2014, Cara Santa Maria was replaced on the show by Meghan McCain and the show moved to a new set. On December 9, 2014 it was announced that Pivot had cancelled the show due to high production costs.

TakePart Live was also streamed live on the website www.takepart.com/live.
