= Code Club =

After-school programming clubs for children

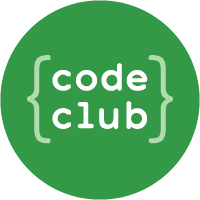
- Founded: 2012
- Founder: Clare Sutcliffe; Linda Sandvik
- Location: United Kingdom
- Region served: United Kingdom
- Website: codeclub.org.uk

Code Club is a voluntary initiative, founded in 2012. The initiative aims to provide opportunities for children aged 9 to 13 to develop coding skills through free after-school clubs. As of November 2015, over 3,800 schools and other public venues established a Code Club, regularly attended by an estimated 44,000 young people across the UK. The organization also expanded internationally, and there are now over 13,000 Code Club operating worldwide. Volunteer programmers and software developers give their time to run Code Club sessions, passing on their programming skills and mentoring the young students. Children create their own computer games, animations and websites, learning how to use technology creatively.

It has Scratch, HTML & CSS, Python and a variety of other coding languages. The initiative also provide free BBC Micro:bits to children above the age of 9.

== History ==
Code Club is the brain child of Clare Sutcliffe and Linda Sandvik,

we share a belief that it is essential that children are introduced to coding at an early age and shown how much fun it can be.

A viral video featuring Prince Andrew, Martha Lane Fox, Chad Hurley, Niklas Zennström, Brent Hoberman and Tim Berners-Lee was released to promote awareness of the project.

On 3 November 2015, it was announced that Code Club had become "a wholly owned subsidiary of the Raspberry Pi Foundation." On 16 March 2018, Clare Sutcliffe, then executive director at Raspberry Pi, announced leaving both Code Club and Raspberry Pi.

== Technologies ==
The curriculum teaches children Scratch, HTML & CSS and Python. Students and teachers use the Trinket web browser application to write code.
