= Carrie Anne Philbin =

Director of Educator Support at the Raspberry Pi Foundation

Carrie Anne Philbin MBE
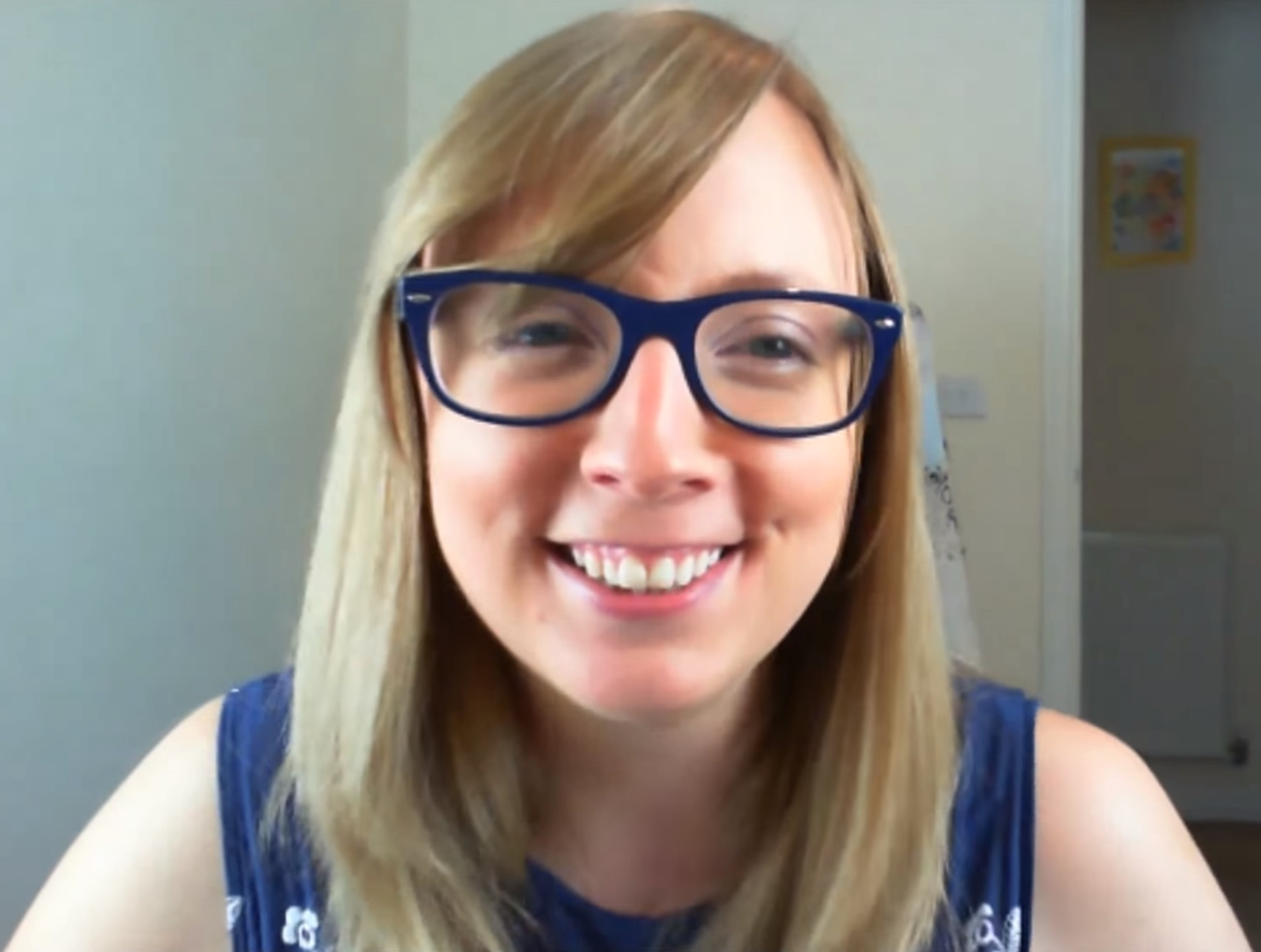
- Philbin on her YouTube channel Geek Gurl Diaries in 2012
- Education: University of Essex; University of East London; University of Cambridge
- Employer(s): Raspberry Pi Foundation; Python Software Foundation
- Known for: Adventures in Raspberry Pi; Crash Course Computer Science
- Scientific career
- Doctoral advisor: Sue Sentance
- Website: about.me/carrieannephilbin

Carrie Anne Philbin is an English teacher of computer science and an author. She is a director of educator support at the Raspberry Pi Foundation and chairs the Computing At School (CAS) diversity and inclusion group, #CASInclude. She wrote the computing book Adventures in Raspberry Pi (2013) for teenagers. She runs the YouTube channel Geek Gurl Diaries and in 2017, was the host for Crash Course Computer Science.

== Early life and education ==
Philbin studied history at the University of Essex. She taught herself to program and manage computer systems after she graduated. She trained as a school computing teacher and worked in East London. As of 2025 she is doing a PhD supervised by Sue Sentance at the University of Cambridge.

== Career ==
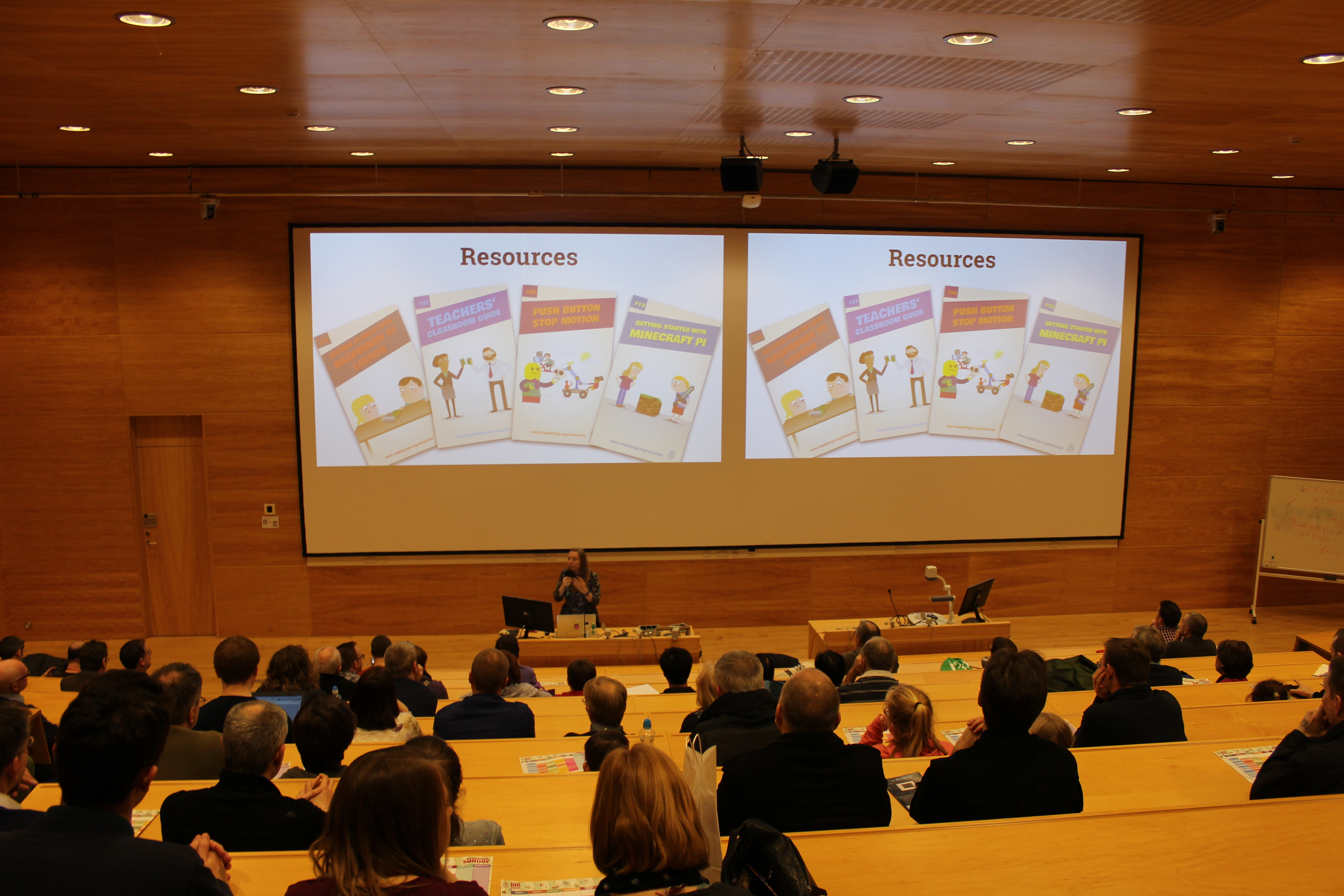
Carrie Anne Philbin speaking at the Raspberry Pi birthday party at the Computer Laboratory, University of Cambridge in 2015

Philbin has been responsible for teaching children and teachers how to code in Python programming language and the Scratch programming language. In 2014 she began to work at the Raspberry Pi Foundation. She is a Google Certified Teacher and was a Skype Movement Maker. Philbin leads strategy, continuing professional development (CPD) program and learning at the Raspberry Pi Foundation. She was an advisor to the Department for Education for the UK's first computing curriculum. In 2016 she was named as one of Computer Weeklys most influential women rising stars. She chairs the Computing At School diversity and inclusion program and was a member of the board of directors at Python Software Foundation until 2017. She was appointed a Fellow of the Python Software Foundation and named Computer Weekly's third most influential woman in IT in 2017. She is a founder member of CasInclude an organisation supporting diversity in computing, for children in school. She won the 2018 FDM Group Everywoman Tech Digital Star Award.

Philbin is a regular speaker at conferences like the British Educational Training and Technology Show (BETT), Raspberry Jams, International Society for Technology in Education (ISTE) conference and Python conferences PyCon AU, EuroPython and PyCon UK.

In 2019, Philbin was 17th in Computer Weekly's 50 'Most Influential Women in UK Tech' shortlist for her role as Director of Education at the Raspberry Pi Foundation

=== Geek Gurl Diaries ===
Geek Gurl Diaries was created by Philbin in 2012 to communicate to young people how exciting and creative science and engineering are. It has 34,000 subscribers on YouTube. It won the TalkTalk Digital Heroes award in 2013.

=== Adventures in Raspberry Pi ===
Adventures in Raspberry Pi first published in 2013 with subsequent editions published in 2014, 2015 and 2016. It contains an introduction to programming as well as 10 projects and instructional videos.

=== Crash Course ===
In 2017 Philbin partnered with Crash Course to create a series of videos explaining the origins of modern computing. The series consists of 41 videos, with between 177,000 and 3,200,000 viewers.

=== Awards and honours ===
She was appointed Member of the Order of the British Empire (MBE) in the 2020 Birthday Honours for services to education.
