= M Jackson =

American geographer and glaciologist

- Education: Western Washington University; University of Montana; University of Oregon
- Known for: National Geographic Explorer
- Scientific career
- Workplaces: National Geographic Society

M Jackson is an American geographer, glaciologist, and National Geographic Society Explorer. She is the author of the popular science books "The Ice Sings Back" The Secret Lives of Glaciers and While Glaciers Slept: Being Human in a Time of Climate Change. M Jackson is a 2018 TED Fellow.

== Early life and education ==
Jackson completed her undergraduate studies at Western Washington University. Jackson then attended the University of Montana, from which she graduated in 2011 with a Master of Science degree. She attended the University of Oregon, where she earned a doctorate in geography and glaciology. She worked in The Glacier Lab under the supervision of Mark Carey. Together they proposed a feminist glaciology framework for global environmental change. They proposed the study to provoke discussion about the people who are researching glaciers, and whose voices are left out. She completed her thesis, "Tangled Up in Blue: Narratives of Glacier Change in Southeast Iceland", in 2017.

Jackson is a three-time U.S. Fulbright Fellow, completing research fellowships in Turkey and Iceland. On her second Fulbright-funded project, she worked in Höfn, Iceland, looking at how climate change affected glacier communities. During her PhD she became a National Geographic Explorer. She has served in the Peace Corps in Zambia.

== Career ==
Jackson has given several TED talks, but is best known for her 2017 TED talk "Glaciers, Gender and Science". Jackson has spoken often on the harassment she received as a female scientist. Jackson is an Arctic expert and Emerging Explorer for the National Geographic Society. She has led expeditions across the Arctic. She regularly visits glaciers around the world.

She is currently working on InTangible Ice, a multi-year project that studies the impacts of the socio-physical dimensions of glacier retreat. The project partners with the National Geographic Explorers, filmmakers and scientists. In 2018, Jackson was announced as a TED Fellow for her work highlighting how people and glaciers interact. In December 2022, Jackson began hosting a 12-episode series on Crash Course on the topic of climate change and energy production.

== While Glaciers Slept ==
Jackson's first book, While Glaciers Slept, was published by Green Writer's Press in June 2015. It explores the parallels between the destruction of the planet as a result of climate change and a family facing the loss of parents. The book combines personal science with exploration, and was well received by critics. The book's foreword is by Bill McKibben. She has given several talks about this book and her exploration work.

== The Secret Lives of Glaciers ==
In 2019, Green Writer's Press published Jackson's second book, The Secret Lives of Glaciers. The book explores what happens when a community's glaciers slowly disappear. Jackson unfolds complex stories of people and glaciers along the southeastern coast of Iceland, exploring the history of glacier science and the world's first glacier monitoring program, the power glaciers enact on local society, perceptions by some in the community that glaciers are alive, and the conflicting and intertwined consequences of rapid glacier change on the cultural fabric of the region. The book has been well received by critics.

== The Ice Sings Back ==
Published in 2023, a novel set in the Cascade Range of Oregon, that follows the impact of a missing girl on the lives of four women. It has been described as an eco-thriller.
