= Naia Butler-Craig =

American aerospace engineer and science communicator (born 1997)

- Born: 2 September 1997 (age 28); Orlando, Florida
- Education: Embry–Riddle Aeronautical University
- Scientific career
- Fields: Aerospace engineering
- Workplaces: Georgia Institute of Technology

Naia Butler-Craig (born September 2, 1997) is an American science communicator and aerospace engineer.

== Early life and education ==
In 2017, Butler-Craig interned at NASA Glenn, working on research into CubeSats as a systems engineer intern. Through her research, she made conclusions around the possibility of increased power without overheating. On September 18, 2017, Butler-Craig attended a symposium sponsored by the College of Arts & Sciences at the Embry-Riddle Aeronautical University as a McNair scholar and presented her research from her time at NASA Glenn.

As of 2022, she is a NASA Space Technology Graduate Research fellow in the High-Power Electric Propulsion Lab at the Georgia Institute of Technology. She joined Georgia Tech to pursue her doctoral research on electric propulsion after graduating from Embry–Riddle Aeronautical University and working in the Space and Science Technology Systems Branch at NASA Glenn Research Center.

== Advocacy ==
While in high school, Butler-Craig participated in the Tech Sassy Girlz camp, and was highlighted in a later article about fundraising for the project. She is the founder of Black Girls in STEM—an initiative to promote Black girls and women to serve as role models for younger scientists—and serves as the Head of Chapters for the Society of Women in Space Exploration.

As an advocate to overcome racism in science, Butler-Craig has been highlighted by NowThis News in a 2021 video, and has spoken with the media including articles by The Atlantic, Space.com, and the All Things Aviation podcast about the day the Perseverance rover landed on Mars. The Organization of Black Aerospace Professionals interviewed her in a 2021 publications sharing careers in aerospace and shared a video of her discussing her career in their Girls Launch program. Butler-Craig has also discussed space propulsion on NPR's Short Wave podcast

== Awards and honors ==
Butler-Craig was named “Executive Member of the Year” by the National Society of Black Engineers, Region III in 2018. In 2019 the Mars Generation program named her on their space award winners. In 2020 she received the Modern-Day Technology Leader Award, part of the Black Engineer of the Year Awards, and Popular Mechanic named her one of ten women to follow on Twitter. She was featured in the 2021 Forbes 30 Under 30 list for Science for her contribution to advancing diversity in STEM. In 2023, as a leading member of the Black In Astro organization, she, alongside the rest of the leading members, was awarded the Royal Astronomical Society Annie Maunder Medal.
