= Shan Boodram =

Canadian sexologist (born 1986)

Shannon (Shan) T. Boodram Brady (born 1986) is a Canadian sexologist, author, actor and content creator. She is the host of the podcast Lovers by Shan, with over five million listeners on Spotify. and was the host and executive producer of the talk show Sexology with Shan Boodram, as well as Crash Course Sex Ed. She also hosted the 2023 reality television series The Marriage Pact and the 2017 series Make Up or Break Up, among many other media appearances, and has been interviewed by many creators and media outlets as a relationship expert.

== Early life and education ==
Shan Boodram was born to Caribbean parents and raised in Toronto, Ontario. She describes displaying interests in physical intimacy from a young age, and that the reaction of the adults around her to this interest influenced her career path.

Boodram completed her Bachelor's degree in psychology at SUNY Empire State College; her Masters of Science in psychology at Arizona State University.

== Career ==
Boodram previously attained a AASECT certification in sex and relationship educator, which expired in June of 2025. She is a member of the American Sexual Health Association.

In 2012, she started the YouTube channel Shan BOODY, which has had over 71 million views as of 2021.

In 2017 she founded the content creation studio Shared Entertainment with her husband Jared Brady. The company has since worked on content for a variety of partners, including the dating app Bumble.

- In 2024, she was featured at the Sexual Health Alliance's online business summit.

== Media ==
=== Books ===
==== The Game of Desire ====
Boodram's 2019 book The Game of Desire: 5 Surprising Secrets to Dating with Dominance and Getting What You Want outlines a five-step strategy for romantic success. Influenced by Neil Strauss's The Game, it also frames romantic pursuits as a 'game', which Boodram describes as a "bonding activity" and by definition consensual.

=== Television series ===
- Hosted The Marriage Pact (premiered August 4, 2023), an eight-episode dating reality series following single friends who made marriage pacts, produced by Maven for the Roku Channel
- Intimacy expert for Peacock's Ex-Rated (premiered August 12, 2021) a dating reality show in which singles are rated by their ex-partners.
- Intimacy expert and workshop facilitator for Netflix's Too Hot to Handle
- Hosted Facebook Watch's Make Up or Break Up (premiered September 7th, 2017), a six-episode dating reality show in which viewers voted on whether couples should stay together.

=== Videos and online content ===
- Host and narrator of CBC's 2022 The Big Sex Talk, a reality and docuseries about gender and sexuality.
- Host and executive producer of Quibi's 2020 Sexology with Shan Boodram, a sex and dating short-form series in which she helps guests with their sexual issues.
- Host of the YouTube series MTV Guide to Sex

=== Podcasts ===
- Lovers and Friends
