= Raspberry Pi Foundation =

British computer science education charity

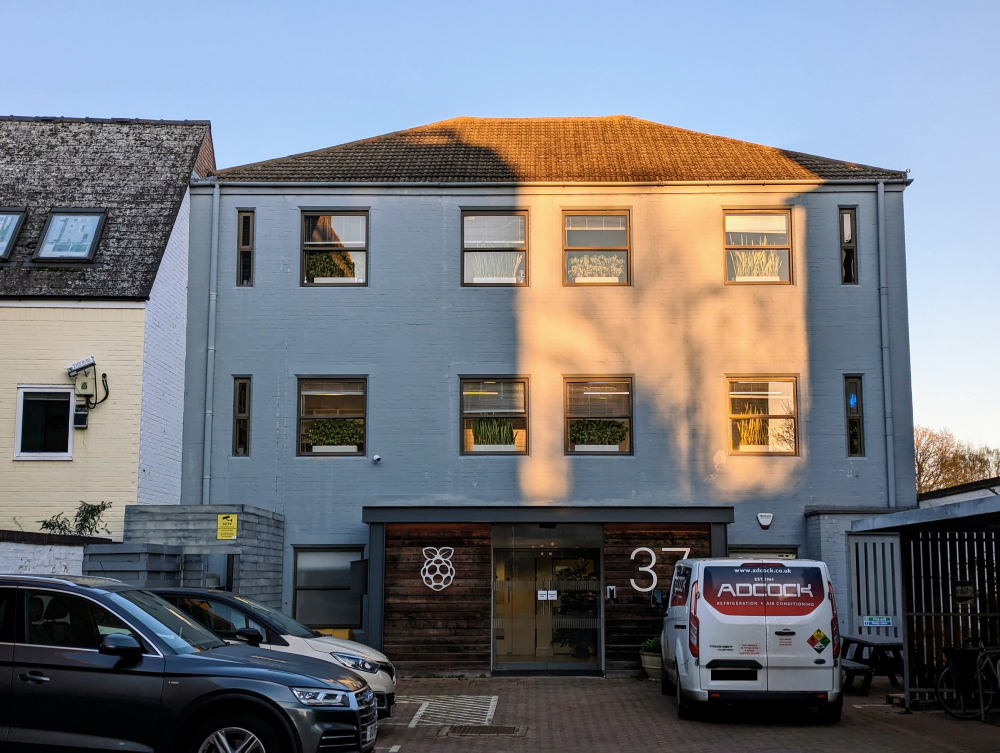
- Raspberry Pi Foundation headquarters in Cambridge
- Formation: May 2009; 17 years ago
- Founders: David Braben; Jack Lang; Pete Lomas; Rob Mullins; Alan Mycroft; Eben Upton
- Founded at: Caldecote, South Cambridgeshire
- Registration no.: 1129409
- Legal status: Company limited by guarantee; Registered charity in England and Wales
- Headquarters: 37 Hills Road, Cambridge, England, U.K.
- Fields: Education
- CEO: Philip Colligan
- Board Chair: John Lazar
- Main organ: Board of trustees
- Website: raspberrypi.org

The Raspberry Pi Foundation is a UK-based educational charity founded in 2008 to promote the study of computer science and related subjects globally, particularly among young people. It is best known for initiating the Raspberry Pi series of single-board computers. These are now designed and sold by Raspberry Pi Holdings, a publicly traded company of which the Foundation is the largest shareholder. While legally distinct, both entities share a mission to democratise access to computing.

== History ==
The Foundation was founded in autumn 2008 by David Braben, Jack Lang, Pete Lomas, Rob Mullins, Alan Mycroft and Eben Upton, and formally registered as a charity in May 2009 in Caldecote, England. Mycroft, Lang, Mullins and Upton were involved with the Computer Lab at the University of Cambridge and were motivated by a decline in applications to study the computer science undergraduate course. Their aim was to develop a computer, available for the price of a textbook, to encourage hands-on experimentation in programming and electronics. Braben, one of the founders of the Frontier Developments contributed insights from the games industry, while Lomas drew on his background in electronics manufacturing.

[T]he lack of programmable hardware for children – the sort of hardware we used to have in the 1980s – is undermining the supply of 18-year-olds who know how to program, so that's a problem for universities, and then it's undermining the supply of 21-year-olds who know how to program, and that's causing problems for industry.

— Co-founder Eben Upton in 2012

After several early prototypes, the first Raspberry Pi computer was launched in 2012. Beyond the originally intended use in education, the computer was quickly adopted by computer and electronics enthusiasts. Many of these users carried their experience with the platform into professional and industrial settings.

To commercialize the computer and meet growing demand, the Foundation established a commercial subsidiary in late 2012 called Raspberry Pi (Trading) Ltd. to develop and manufacture its computing products. The profits of this company used to fund the charitable work of the foundation. Between 2012 and 2024, the commercial subsidiary contributed nearly US$50 million to the Foundation, alongside over US$60 million raised from philanthropy and other sources.

Upton left the foundation board in December 2012 to lead both the new company and foundation as CEO. In September 2013 Lance Howarth became CEO of the foundation, allowing Upton to focus on the company. Philip Colligan took over as CEO of the foundation in July 2015. In 2016, The foundation moved its headquarters to Station Road, Cambridge, moving again in 2018, to Hills Road, Cambridge.

In 2015, the Raspberry Pi Foundation acquired Code Club. In 2017, it acquired CoderDojo.

In July 2024, the foundation spun off its commercial subsidiary as a publicly traded company. The foundation supported the move and said it would use proceeds from share sales to create an endowment for its educational work. It also said it would remain a major shareholder and stakeholder in the company's future. Following the company's initial public offering, the foundation's shareholding in Raspberry Pi Holdings fell from 77.31% to 49.08%. The sale raised £136 million to fund the endowment.

== Activities ==
The Foundation delivers educational programmes promoting the study of computer science and related subjects worldwide, including teacher training, curriculum resources, and outreach initiatives.

In April 2014, the foundation announced a £1 million education fund to support projects that enhance the understanding of computing and to promote the use of technology in other subjects, particularly STEM and creative arts for children. They offered to provide up to 50% of the total projected costs to successful applicants. Carrie Anne Philbin was the Director of Education.

The Raspberry Foundation is an active sponsor of the British edition of the International Bebras Computing competition, together with the University of Oxford.

The foundation publishes Hello World, a "computing and digital making" magazine. From 2018 to early 2023, the foundation published Wireframe, a video game development magazine.

In 2023, the foundation worked alongside the Greater Manchester Combined Authority to create a Certificate in Applied Computing as part of the MBacc, a local baccalaureate qualification.
