= Dave Jorgenson =

American video producer

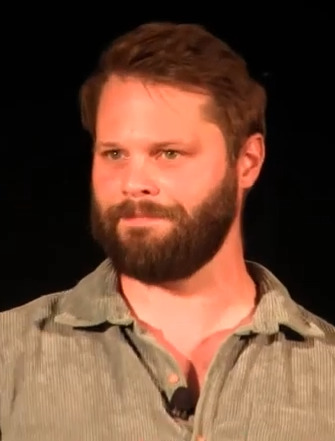
- Jorgenson at VidCon 2022
- Education: University of Tulsa
- Alma mater: DePauw University (BA)
- Occupation: Journalist
- Years active: 2014–present
- Employer(s): Independent Journal Review; The Washington Post
- Known for: TikToks, YouTube

Dave Jorgenson is an American journalist and video producer, best known as the face of The Washington Post's TikTok and YouTube accounts until July 2025, when he left to start his own media company, Local News International.

His TikTok account has over 254,300 followers and over 5,900,000 million likes as of February 2026. The Washington Post's TikTok account had over 1,900,000 followers and over 103,000,000 likes when he left in July 2025. In 2026, Rolling Stone ranked him 15th on its list of the 25 Most Influential Creators of 2026.

== Early life ==
Dave Jorgenson was born to Mary and Mark Jorgenson. He graduated from Shawnee Mission North High School in Overland Park, Kansas, in 2009. He was the sports editor for the school's yearbook, and member of the Pep Club, drumline, theater and basketball. Jorgenson attended the University of Tulsa and graduated from DePauw University in 2013 with a Bachelor of Arts in creative writing. Jorgenson is an Eagle Scout.

== Career ==
Jorgenson interned at The Colbert Report during the 2012 election. From 2014 to 2017, he produced videos for the Independent Journal Review. In May 2017, he joined The Washington Post as a creative video producer, where he wrote and produced their "Department of Satire" series. He launched the newspaper's TikTok account in May 2019, after which it quickly went viral.

The account's videos focus largely on newsroom operations, making use of nerd humor. The Atlantic described the account as "self-aware, slapstick, and slightly cringey—a parade of pets, stunts, and workplace humor, often set to blaring pop music and shot through with a winking sense of humor about the very fact that a 142-year-old newspaper is even on here in the first place". Another running gag in the channel's videos is Jorgenson's similarity in appearance to the Vice President of the United States, JD Vance, whom he jokingly clarifies he is not on his social media platforms.

Jorgenson has drawn attention for his project's success in connecting with Generation Z, a task that many other mainstream newspapers have struggled with.

Jorgenson published a book titled Make a TikTok Every Day in June 2021, which features one TikTok video idea for every day of the year and includes 12 interviews with creators.

In July 2025, Jorgenson announced he would be leaving The Washington Post the following month and starting his own video company alongside two of his colleagues.

== Personal life ==
Jorgenson resides with his wife, Mariana, in a one-bedroom apartment where he films many of his videos. In July 2023, he announced that he and his wife were expecting a child.
