= Alizé Carrère =

American climate researcher and filmmaker

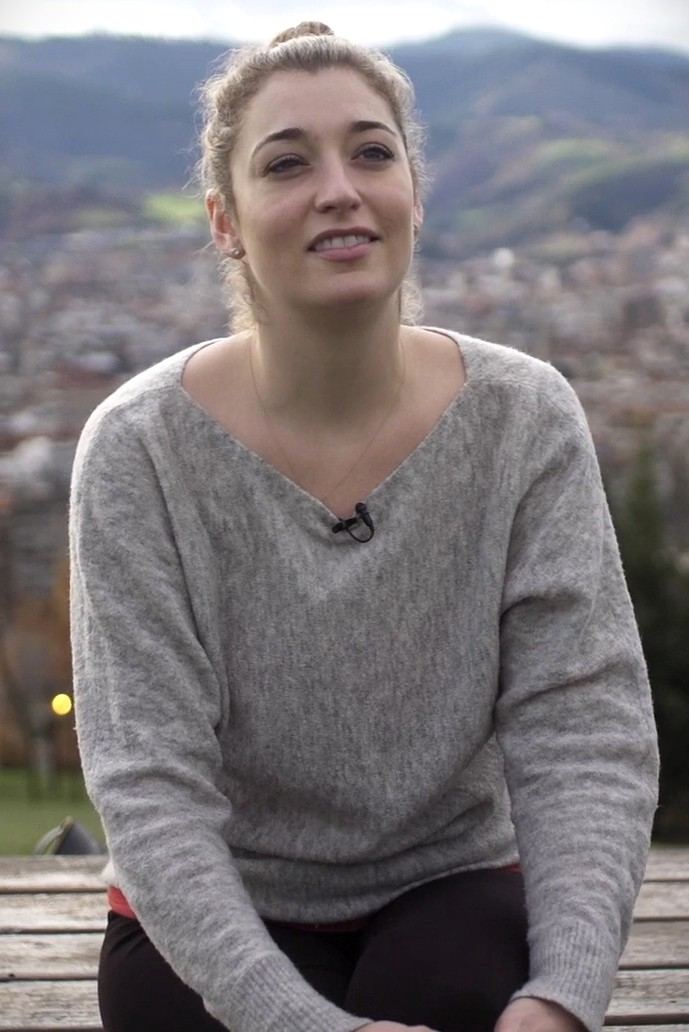
- Carrère in 2017
- Born: 1989 (age 36–37)
- Occupations: Climate researcher, filmmaker, science communicator
- Years active: 2013-present
- Notable work: Adaptation (series)
- Awards: Best Short Film at the New York WILD Film Festival; Earth Catalyst Award at EarthX (2020); Norman Vaughn Indomitable Spirit Award at the Telluride Mountainfilm Festival
- Website: alizecarrere.com

Alizé Carrère is a French-American climate researcher, filmmaker and science communicator. As a social scientist, she studies how humans adapt to changing physical environments, particularly with respect to climate change. Her academic research and filmmaking focus on the theme of human resilience to environmental change.

In 2013, while attending McGill University in Montreal, Canada, she won a grant from National Geographic and she used the funds to travel to Madagascar to study how farmers were adapting to deforestation. Learning of farmers who were using erosional gullies as unique places to grow crops, she went on to study other ways that people were learning to adapt to profound environmental change. She received two additional grants from the National Geographic Society and filmmaker grants from The Redford Center and PBS to support the completion of a film series based on this work, titled ADAPTATION. Carrère is the creator, producer and host of the series, which is distributed by PBS. The first episode documented community adaptations to sea level rise in Bangladesh, such as the use of floating farms, schools and hospitals. The floating farms are made of bamboo and water hyacinth. It won Best Short Film at the New York WILD Film Festival and the Norman Vaughn Indomitable Spirit Award at Telluride Mountainfilm Festival. The second episode examines how an invasive species of freshwater fish, Asian carp, has taken over rivers and lakes in the United States and what communities along the Mississippi and Ohio Rivers are doing to manage the problem.

Previously she worked for Lindblad Expeditions, designing and leading expeditions around coastal Europe aboard the fleet's 102-passenger vessel the National Geographic Orion.

As a child, Carrère grew up in a tree house built by her father along the shores of Lake Cayuga in Ithaca, New York. In 2021, she was pursuing a Doctor of Philosophy degree in Ecosystem Science & Policy at the Abess Center at the University of Miami.
