= PBS Digital Studios =

Non-profit distributor of educational video content

- Formation: 2012; 14 years ago
- Headquarters: Arlington, Virginia
- Owner: PBS Distribution
- Key people: Noel C. Bloom
- Parent organization: WETA-TV
- Affiliations: PBS
- Website: www.pbs.org/digital-studios

PBS Digital Studios is a non-profit organization through which PBS distributes original educational web video content. Based in Arlington, Virginia, it comprises both original series and partnerships with existing YouTube channels. Most of the series are about science, popular culture, art, food, news, and music.

== History ==
PBS Digital Studios was founded by Jason Seiken in June 2012. They had their first viral hit with a "remix" of autotuned vocals from Mr. Rogers' Neighborhood titled "Garden of Your Mind."

The PBS Digital Studios network has received more than 500 million views and has over 7 million subscribers. Popular series found on their channels include Crash Course, Blank on Blank, It's Okay To Be Smart, and the multiple Webby Award–winning PBS Idea Channel. Each month, the shows average more than 5 million streams.

Its first scripted series, Frankenstein, MD, launched on August 19, 2014, and ran until October 31, 2014.

In 2015, PBS Digital Studios partnered with the Green brothers' series Crash Course, commissioning three courses in astronomy, U.S. government, and philosophy. Crash Course Astronomy launched January 15, 2015, Crash Course U.S. Government & Politics launched January 23, 2015, and Crash Course Philosophy launched February 8, 2016.

In addition to commissioning series, PBS Digital Studios have partnered with existing YouTube channels. They partnered with BrainCraft in June 2014 and Physics Girl in August 2015.

In 2017, the network cancelled a slew of its shows, including popular channels like PBS Game/Show & the PBS Idea Channel.

== Current series ==
- Be Smart
- CrashCourse
- Deep Look
- Monstrum
- Only in El Paso
- Otherwords
- PBS Eons
- PBS Origins
- PBS Space Time
- PBS Terra
- Plotlines
- Sound Field
- Two Cents

== Past series ==
As of December 2020, PBS Digital Studios lists the following as "past" series:

- 24 Frames
- Above The Noise
- America From Scratch
- American Veteran: Keep It Close
- A Moment of Science
- A People's History of Asian America
- Are You MN Enough?
- The Art Assignment
- BBQwithFranklin
- Beat Making Lab
- Blank on Blank
- Bon Appétempt
- BrainCraft
- Brave Spaces
- Central Standard
- Citizen Better
- Dead and Buried
- Everything But the News
- Fate & Fabled
- First Person
- FullTimeKid
- Future of Work
- Good Gumbo
- The Good Stuff
- Gross Science
- Global Weirding with Katharine Hayhoe
- Hip-Hop and the Metaverse
- Hot Mess
- I Contain Multitudes
- If Cities Could Dance
- The Intergalactic Nemesis
- Indie Alaska
- Indie Lens Storycast
- InventorSeries
- It's Lit!
- Latinos Are Essential
- Makin' Friends with Ryan Miller
- Mike Likes Science
- Modern Comedian
- NOURISH
- opbmusicStagepass
- Origin Of Everything
- Outside the Lyrics
- Parentalogic
- PBS Diorama
- PBS Game/Show
- PBS Idea Channel
- PBS Infinite Series
- PBSoffbook
- PBS ReInventors
- PBS Short Docs
- PBS Vitals
- Pancake Mountain
- Physics Girl
- Prideland
- Reactions
- Ritual
- Say It Loud
- Self-Evident
- Serving Up Science
- Shanks FX
- Sovereign Innovations
- STELLAR
- Subcultured
- Tacos of Texas
- The ChatterBox
- The Story in Us
- Unusual Creatures
- You're Doing it Wrong

== Reception ==
Evan Desimone of NewMediaRockstars wrote, "Brilliant...takes you somewhere you didn’t expect." Sam Gutelle of Tubefilter called Idea Channel show, "Nothing short of superb."
