= Buffer Festival =

Annual film festival held in Toronto, Ontario, Canada

- Location: Toronto, Ontario, Canada
- Founded: 2013
- Founded by: Corey Vidal
- Type of play: Online Video
- Language: International
- Website: bufferfestival.com

Buffer Festival is an international digital video festival, held annually in Toronto, Ontario. The festival, founded in 2013 by Corey Vidal, Corrado Coia, and Samantha Fall of the Apprentice, a YouTube channel, showcases the talent of online video creators who have debuted their work on YouTube. Buffer Festival has been called "The Digital version of the Toronto International Film Festival" and "The World's first festival dedicated to YouTube content".

== History ==
=== Beginnings ===
The concept for the festival was conceived in 2011, and was inspired by the Toronto International Film Festival. Vidal's vision for the event was sparked specifically by his visit to red carpets at TIFF in 2011. He describes leaving the festival and wanting a communal viewing experience focused on YouTube videos, saying that "traditional Hollywood and television have these experiences, and now it's time for YouTube to have these experiences too." "YouTube is moving toward a direction of professionalism," said Coia, "Some of these YouTubers have feature-length films in episodic format, and they do actually rival Hollywood quality. So they need to get the proper treatment — get them in a nice theater."

In 2012, the ApprenticeA Productions team (led by Vidal) applied to the Canadian Film Centre's media accelerator programme, ideaBOOST, in order to produce the festival, and the application was successful. The team was one of seven teams participating in the ideaBOOST programme in its inaugural year from 2012 to 2013. The ApprenticeA production team approached both YouTube and TIFF from the outset, to ask them to be partners for the event. "If they're not on board, we shouldn't even bother doing it," said Vidal.

The festival was launched via an official announcement video on YouTube on September 4, 2013.

=== 2013 festival ===
The first Buffer Festival was held from November 8 to 10 2013 in Toronto's Entertainment District. The festival's screenings were spread across six different movie theatres, including TIFF Bell Lightbox, Scotiabank Theatre Toronto, Glenn Gould Studio, CN Tower Maple Leaf Theatre and Jane Mallett Theatre. Theatrical-length shows (averaging 90 minutes of YouTube footage and host dialogue) were shown over the course of three days. The event also featured meetups at the Metro Toronto Convention Centre which gave fans the opportunity to meet their favourite YouTube creators.

Partners for the initial festival included YouTube, TIFF Next Wave, Cineplex, Canon, and Tim Hortons. The festival hosted more than 70 well-known YouTube creators as part of the event's entertainment roster. These included Andrew Gunadie, Charlotte McDonnell (formerly Charlie McDonnell), Chris Pirillo, Craig Benzine, Grace Helbig, Hannah Hart, Jack Douglass, Jenn McAllister, Lilly Singh, Mamrie Hart, Matthew Santoro, Meghan Tonjes, Michael Aranda, PrankvsPrank, Tay Zonday, The Fine Bros, and Tim Deegan, among others. Over 5,000 tickets were sold internationally, with around 2,000 people attending the event on its opening day.

=== 2014 festival ===
The second annual Buffer Festival was held from October 16 to 19, 2014. The festival followed a similar format to the first, with the addition of new features and events, including an "Industry Day", co-produced by the Canadian Film Centre. Additionally, the festival began accepting video submissions from the general public.

Events were held at the TIFF Bell Lightbox and the Scotiabank Theatre, as well as the Metro Toronto Convention Centre.

Some of the featured guests included Andrew Gunadie, Charles Trippy, Charlotte McDonnell, Chris Pirillo, Craig Benzine, EpicMealTime, Grace Helbig, Hannah Hart, Jack Douglass, Jenn McAllister, Lilly Singh, Mamrie Hart, Matthew Santoro, Meghan Tonjes, Michael Aranda, Olan Rogers, PrankvsPrank, Rhett and Link, Shay Carl, Tay Zonday, Toby Turner, The Fine Bros, and Tim Deegan.

Over 10,000 tickets were sold for the 2014 festival. Partners included YouTube, HTC, the Canadian Broadcasting Company, Doritos, Canon, Blue Ant, Tim Hortons, and Just Eat. Star Wars also had an official screening for their Fan Film Showcase, hosted in partnership with Lucasfilm.

=== 2015 festival ===
The 2015 Buffer Festival was held from October 23 to 25, 2015. It featured the addition of a Creator Day to the programming—a day-long workshop featuring creators, industry members, and technical professionals focused on providing advice to up-and-coming YouTube creators. Venues included the St. Lawrence Centre for the Arts, the John W.H. Bassett Theatre, the CBC Building and Roy Thomson Hall. Partners of the 2015 festival included YouTube, LG, CBC, and Canon.

=== 2016 festival ===
The 2016 Buffer Festival was held October 20–23, 2016 at the Metro Toronto Convention Centre and the St. Lawrence Centre for the Arts. Events included multiple film screenings, a Gala Award Show, red carpets, workshops, and panels. Over 100 Featured Creators premiered videos at one of the screenings, including one by astronaut Col. Chris Hadfield. Sponsors included Adobe, YouTube Red, and the Canadian Film Centre.

=== 2017 festival ===
The 2017 Buffer Festival was held September 28-October 1, 2017 at the Elgin and Winter Garden Theatres in Toronto. A new feature at the 2017 event was an awards night. Ten awards were presented, for excellence in:

- Cinematography – Marko and Alex Ayling
- Comedy – Adrian Bliss
- Cultural Experience – Melanie Murphy
- Diversity – Ari Fitz
- Editing – Ollie Ritchie
- Inspiration – Chantel Houston
- Production – Andrew Huang
- Sound – Ciaran O'Brien and Sammy Paul
- Storytelling – PrankMe (Hazel Hayes)
- Writing – Tim Hautekiet and Dominic Fera

== Programme ==
Buffer Festival features several different types of programming:

- Theatrical screenings of curated YouTube videos.
- Meetups, which allow fans to meet their favourite YouTube creators.
- The Gala Red Carpet, an outdoor red carpet with interviews and autograph opportunities.
- The Gala Premiere, a limited-seating screening whereby featured YouTube creators are given the opportunity to unveil new work in a theatrical setting.
- Industry Day, a one-day conference aimed at "industry professionals" - brands, celebrity YouTubers, multi-channel networks, and those working in digital marketing and entertainment - to promote skill-sharing, networking and strategy amongst those who utilise YouTube as a key marketing or distribution outlet.
- Creator Day, a day-long series of workshops that focuses on providing advice to up-and-coming YouTube creators, which debuted at the 2015 event.
