= Driftless Pony Club =

American indie rock band

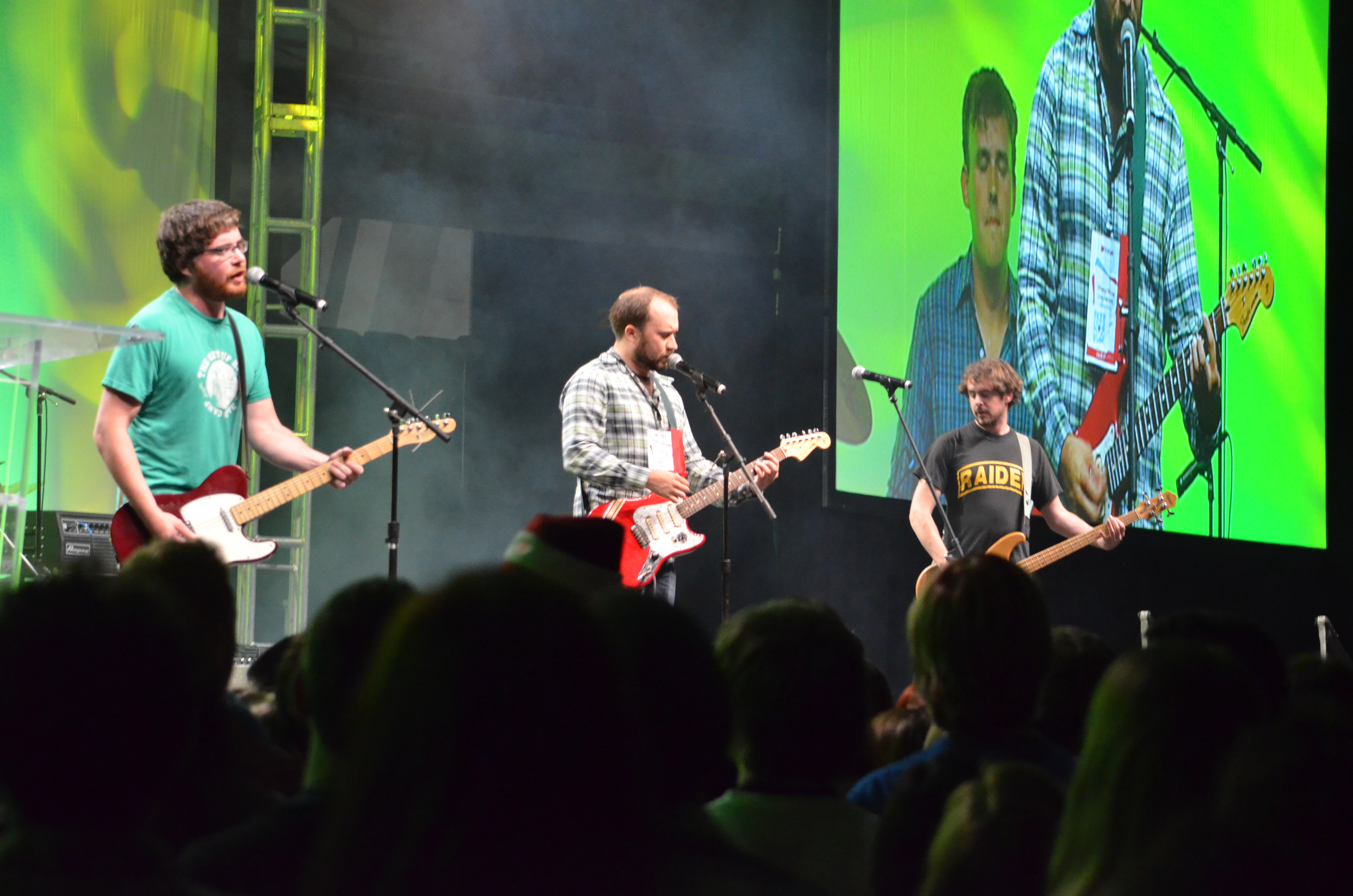
- Driftless Pony Club at VidCon 2012

Background information
- Origin: Chicago, Illinois, United States
- Genres: Alternative rock, indie rock
- Years active: 1999–present
- Labels: DFTBA Records, Sector Five, Two Thumbs Down
- Members: Craig Benzine; Matt Weber; Sam Grant; Nate Bartley
- Website: Band Website; Craig Benzine's Website

Driftless Pony Club is a Chicago, Illinois-based indie rock band. Its lead singer and guitarist is Craig Benzine, who also produces YouTube videos under the alias "WheezyWaiter". After releasing two albums (2004's Janel and 2006's Cholera) on the Madison, Wisconsin-based Sector Five Records, the band signed with DFTBA Records, on which they released their first profitable release, the EP Expert, in August 2009. Driftless Pony Club has toured across the United States multiple times, and has performed in lineups with other bands affiliated with DFTBA Records including Hank Green and the Perfect Strangers, Andrew Huang, Rob Scallon, and Harry and the Potters.

== Discography ==
- Janel (2004)
- Cholera (2006)
- Expert (2009)
- Buckminster (2011)
- Magnicifent (2012)
- Zastera (2016)
