= First of October (band) =

American music duo known for producing albums in a day

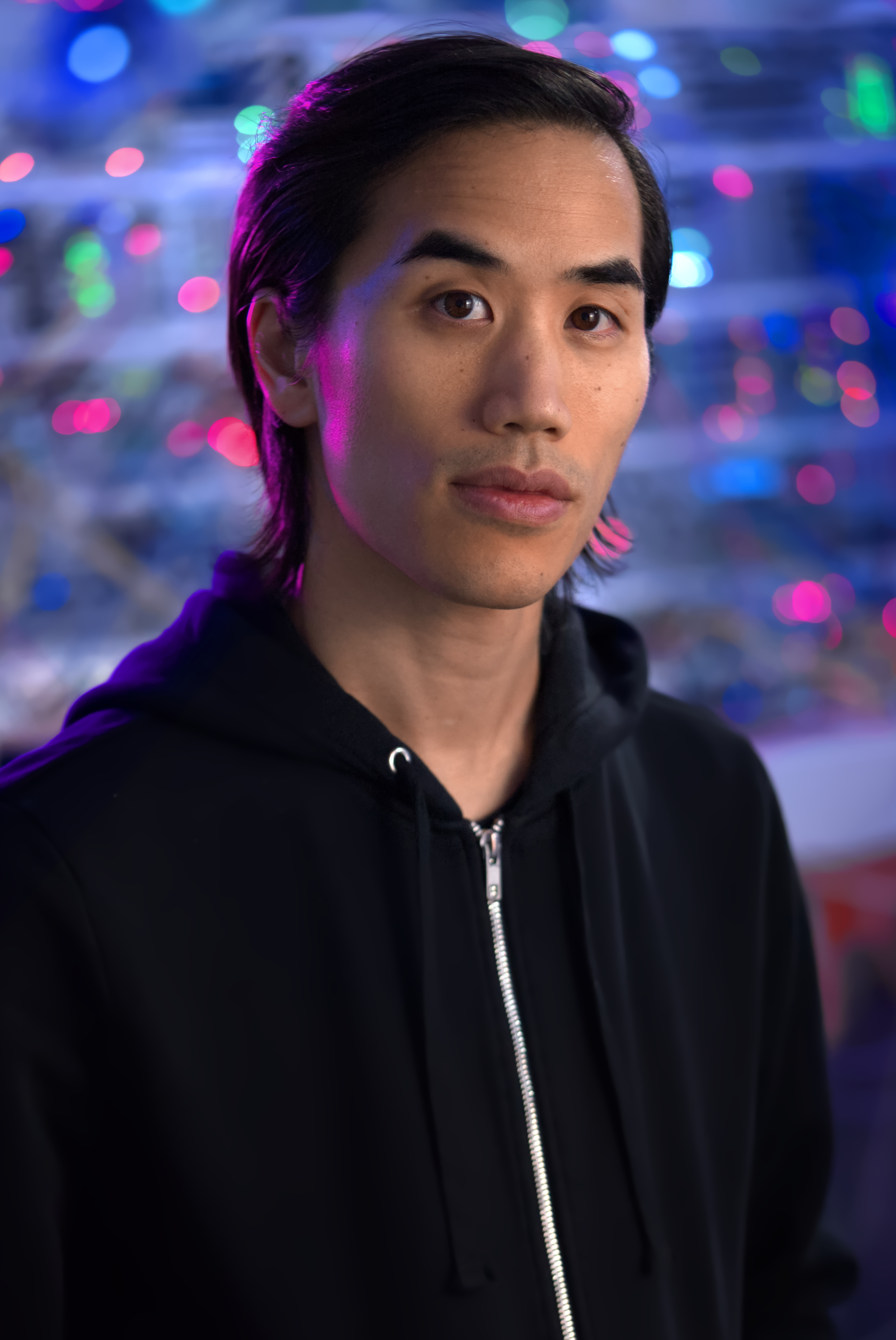
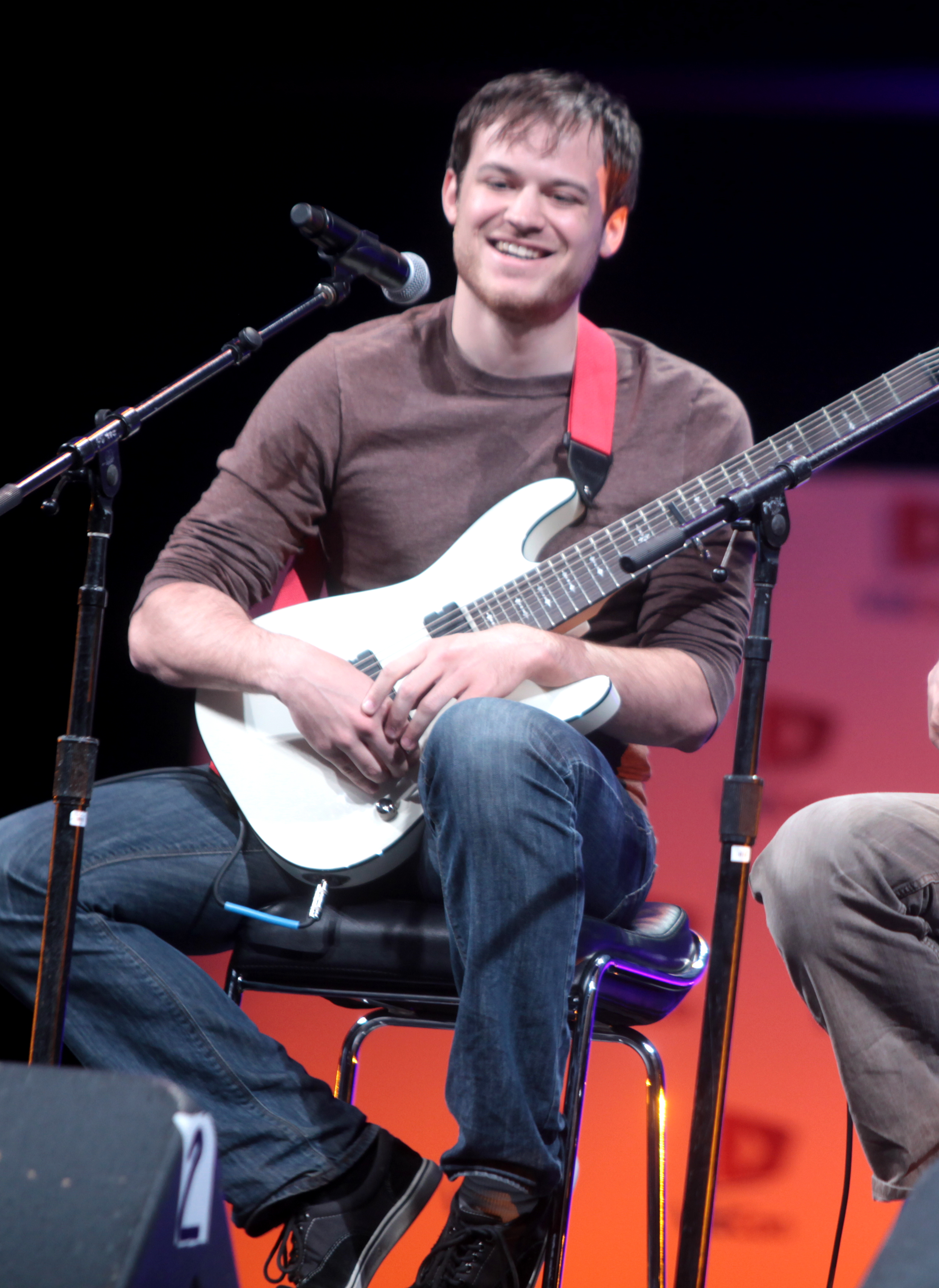
- Huang (left) and Scallon (right)

Background information
- Origin: Chicago, Illinois, United States
- Genres: Rock, pop, power pop, Midwest emo, indie rock, punk rock, funk metal, progressive rock, heavy metal
- Years active: 2018–2019; 2021–present
- Members: Rob Scallon: Andrew Huang

First of October is an American-Canadian indie rock duo formed in Chicago, Illinois, in 2018. It was formed between musical YouTubers Rob Scallon and Andrew Huang from an idea where they would go into a recording studio and write and record a 10-track album in a 10-hour recording session. After their first album Ten Hours, each subsequent album recording session was increased to 12 hours. The duo's name is derived from the date they recorded their first album, and the same date they continue to record on each year. The band has recorded and released eight albums of the sort since 2018, with plans to repeat the project annually.

== History ==
=== Background ===
Scallon and Huang both rose to prominence as internet musicians. Huang founded the website "Songs to Wear Pants To" as a way to earn money for commissioned songs. Scallon was inspired by Huang's project, and started a personal MySpace page to promote his own music. Huang moved to YouTube in 2006, and Scallon followed in 2007. The two began to frequently collaborate on the platform.

Both Huang and Scallon were members of the Perfect Strangers, the backing band for Hank Green. The group released one album in 2014, Incongruent.

Since the formation of First of October in 2018, Huang and Scallon have continued to collaborate outside of the band. For example, the duo premiered the YouTube series Sonic Boom in 2023. The production features Huang and Scallon completing various musical challenges or experimenting with unique instruments.

=== 2018–2020: Ten Hours and Gourmet Ravioli ===
First of October formed in late 2018 for a YouTube video where the two would write and record an entire album in a single 10-hour session. Their first album, Ten Hours, was recorded in Uptown Recording studio on October 1, 2018, and released two weeks later on October 15. The album was mixed and produced by Rob Ruccia of Uptown Recording and formerly of nu metal band From Zero. There was no tour to support the album, which was self-released online. Huang announced the breakup of the band in a video containing all the album's songs, "The band name is the First of October, because that was the day we recorded the album, and the band doesn't exist any other day of the year!" In 2025, Scallon stated that their original goal was to make "the worst album ever", as he believed it would increase the entertainment value of the video. He admitted to the difficulty of the project, explaining that "making the video was harder than making the album".

Exactly one year after the recording of their first album, the band announced in a rerelease of their song "Don't Go" (featuring Brandon Acker on theorbo) that they had reunited in the studio to record a second album to be released later that month. This time there were more instruments than the previous year they recorded, now featuring a piano, synth, 12-string electric guitar in E♭ tuning, and a short scale electric guitar in F♯ tuning. For this session they gave themselves an additional 2 hours for lunch and a break. The album, called Gourmet Ravioli (in reference to a song on the album titled "Ravioli"), was recorded in a single 12-hour session and was released on October 26, 2019. At the end of the behind the scenes video on Scallon's YouTube channel, he hinted at another album for 2020, saying, "Thanks for being such a fan of our one day a year band. See you next year." These plans were cancelled due to the COVID-19 pandemic, which Scallon announced on Twitter.

=== 2021–2022: Gotta Record Everything Good and CHAOS ===
On September 30, 2021, Huang uploaded a YouTube video titled "This Is the End", and Scallon posted a comment confirming he and Huang would be reuniting in the studio to record their third album for 2021. On the first of October itself, Rob Scallon posted on the community page of his YouTube channel "First of October is Happening :)" along with a picture of their studio, now in Canada, with a 12-hour timer. They released their third album Gotta Record Everything Good on October 26, 2021, again with additional instruments such as ukulele, mandolin, 5 and 6-string basses, and banjo. In addition, this was their first album to feature an eleventh song, which was recorded in the final three minutes. The title of the album comes from a recurring character in their discography called Greg, who is mentioned in “Don’t Go to My House” on Ten Hours, “Thirty-First of October” on Gourmet Ravioli, and “Greg!” on this album. Here, Greg is also an acronym for Gotta Record Everything Good, an idea that came from their engineer Rob Ruccia while Scallon and Huang were writing "I Am Not Afraid". Scallon again hinted at an upcoming album for 2022, saying "Thanks so much for being a fan of our one day a year band. See you next year."

On October 1, 2022, Huang published a video of him and Scallon writing 100 riffs in a day to prove that First of October was true improvisation. This would be the inspiration for their song "Riff Lord" on the following album. That day, Scallon uploaded a video to Twitter announcing the return of the band, now back in Chicago. Huang uploaded the same video to his Twitter. Huang and Scallon also announced that they would be releasing more merchandise, including t-shirts, beanies, pins, and cassette tapes distributed through DFTBA Records. Throughout the day Huang and Scallon put out a series of twelve tweets each on their personal accounts, saying the same thing as the other member, seemingly revealing the upcoming album's song titles as they were recording (two of those tweets were renaming songs). They would continue to announce the song titles like this on their subsequent albums until 2025. On October 22, Huang announced the album's name was CHAOS. It was released on October 26. The album was more Halloween-focused and heavier compared to their previous records, as the last two albums contained only one song centered around the holiday, whereas this album had four. This was also their first record to not mention their character, Greg, on any track. On November 5, Scallon posted a video on his secondary YouTube channel, the video titled "Guitar pedals we used on 'CHAOS' (album in a day 2022)". At the end of the video, Rob confirmed they were planning on doing another album the following year.

=== 2023–2025: Across the Road, Round 6 and One Week ===
On October 25, 2022, the day before CHAOS was released, Scallon said on his Patreon-exclusive commentary of the behind-the-scenes video of CHAOS that he and Huang were planning on recording their next album at Abbey Road Studios in London. (Note: RobScallon2 (October 25, 2022). FOO 2022 Commentary – via YouTube.) On October 1, 2023, Scallon posted a video on X publicly announcing that they would be recording their fifth studio album at Abbey Road Studios. Despite report of a delay, Across the Road and its accompanying videos were released as scheduled on October 26, 2023. The album's title and cover were derived from The Beatles' Abbey Road album. Other names that were considered were "Rob, Rob, Andrew, and Greg", "October's Garden", and "Here Comes The Fun". During the session, Rob stated that he was experiencing undisclosed medical issues, later revealed to be bipolar I disorder, that were hindering his ability to write songs quickly, only primarily writing three tracks for the album. Scallon would later say of the session, "[The] Abbey Road First of October is actually kind of a touchy subject for me. In that it was this big awesome thing, but due to some medical stuff I had going on, I wasn't able to enjoy it. ... Honestly, I really did not have a good time at all." (Note: RobScallon2 (November 15, 2024). Album in a Day 2024 Commentary – via YouTube.) After the session, Scallon said that everyone who was in studio with them that day ended up contracting COVID-19. (Note: RobScallon2 (October 23, 2023). FOO 2023 Commentary Road – via YouTube.) Their character, Greg, was again absent in this release.

On October 1, 2024, Scallon, having fully recovered from the depression he was experiencing in 2023, announced on X that recording for the band's 2024 album had been delayed to October 19 because a team member contracted COVID-19. This was the first time the band had ever recorded a First of October album on a date other than October 1. The album, Round 6, was released November 16, 2024. The album was heavily inspired by video games of the early 1990s, particularly fighting and dungeon-crawler games. During recording, they used the sound chips of the Super Nintendo Entertainment System and Nintendo Game Boy to record numerous sections of songs. They also used a melodica, 2-string bass, bear bells, and 8-string electric guitar, at various points. At the beginning of recording, the band experienced over half an hour of technical difficulties relating to the Game Boy. They tried to write a song on acoustic guitar while the issues were being worked on, but decided they did not want to start with a slow song. After the issues were resolved, the group decided to restart the 12-hour timer and start over. The album was the first since Gotta Record Everything Good to mention Greg, whose actor showed up at Uptown Recording Studio while the duo was recording the album. Huang was experiencing a cold on the day of recording.

On September 30, 2025, Huang and Scallon posted pictures of themselves in a Guitar Center on social media, announcing that the 2025 album will be recorded in an open Guitar Center. That day, Scallon's wife Tamara asked the band's subreddit for Bingo ideas for the upcoming recording session. About two weeks later, Scallon revealed the song titles for the album on social media. The album, One Week, was released on October 26, 2025. For this album, the band made a concerted effort to make the songs longer, as the previous three albums were less than twenty minutes long. Recording the album in a Guitar Center gave the duo a much wider range of options than they were used to. Throughout recording, a crowd began to form around the band as they recorded, incorporating them into the recording process by asking for lyrical ideas, chords, and crowd vocals, such as on the last song Greg Is Coming To Town!

=== 2026–present: A Future Without You ===
On October 1, 2026, Scallon posted a photo of himself and Huang in the studio, confirming an upcoming eighth album. On October 19, Scallon revealed the album title, cover art and track listing on Instagram. A Future Without You, was released alongside the behind-the-scenes video documenting the recording on October 26, 2026. The album was recorded at Electrical Audio in Chicago, Illinois, and featured the band using a combination of their own equipment and instruments owned by the studio, including former Electrical Audio owner Steve Albini's aluminium neck guitar. At the beginning of the video, Scallon and Huang stated that although the band would aim to record ten tracks, eight would be considered acceptable if they "were really feeling a song" and wanted to spend more time on it. Ultimately, ten tracks were recorded and released. Songs included the distorted clavinet-driven "Sexy Ghost", a Hip-hop diss track aimed at Foo Fighters frontman Dave Grohl titled "Fight With Dave", and the ballad "Here", which at 4:38, is the bands longest song to date. Other names that were considered for the album included "Day of Our Lives", "Everyone Thinks That I'm Fine", "Foo Fighter Fighters" and "The Colour and the Shape and also more stuff because we're a better band".

== Band members ==
Current lineup

- Rob Scallon – lead and backing vocals, lead and rhythm guitars, bass guitar, drums, mandolin, banjo, ukulele, keyboards, balalaika, theremin, percussion, harmonica, melodica, upright bass
- Andrew Huang – lead and backing vocals, rhythm and lead guitars, drums, keyboards, bass guitar, ukulele, percussion, keytar

Additional personnel

- Rob Ruccia – recording, engineering, mixing

== Discography ==
- Ten Hours (2018)
- Gourmet Ravioli (2019)
- Gotta Record Everything Good (2021)
- CHAOS (2022)
- Across The Road (2023)
- Round 6 (2024)
- One Week (2025)
- A Future Without You (2026)
