= Good Store =

Charitable e-commerce company

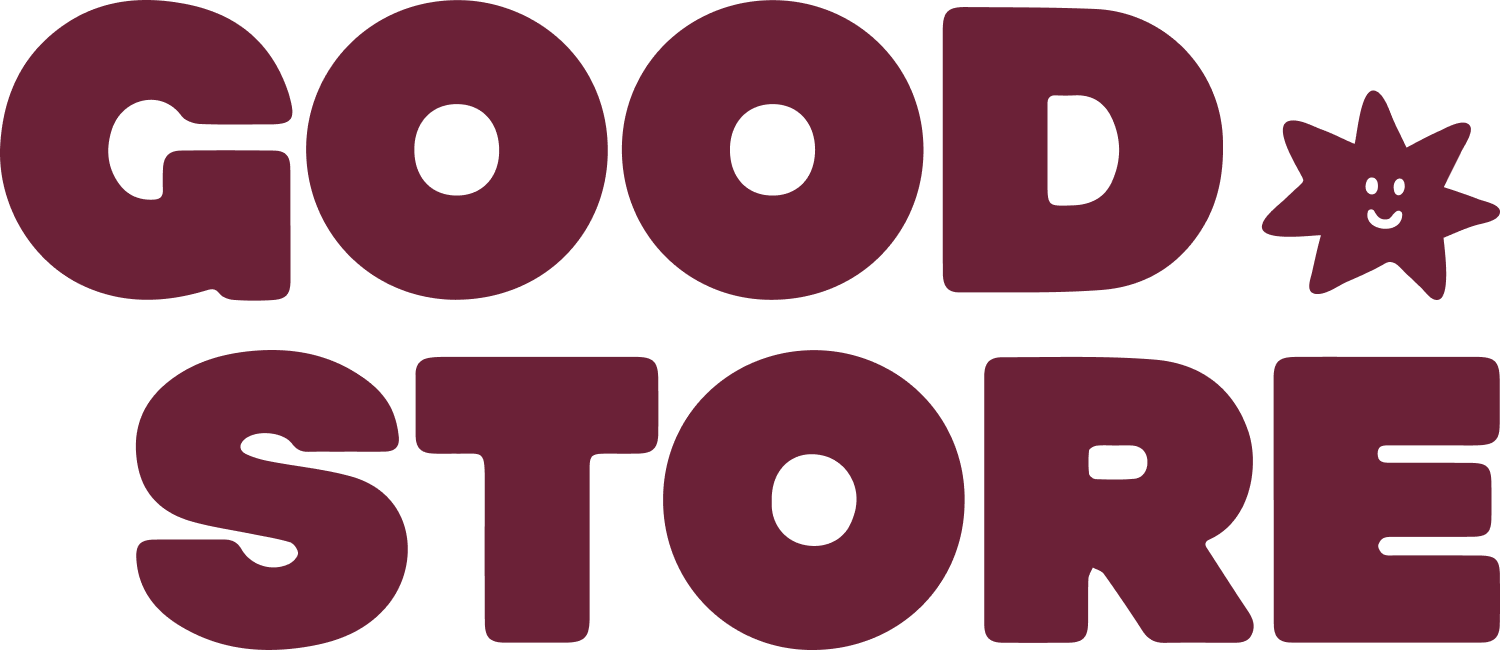
- Good Store logo
- Type: Private
- Founded: 2023; 3 years ago
- Founder: Hank Green; John Green
- Headquarters: Missoula, Montana
- Key people: Laura Jones Joukovski (CEO)
- Products: Socks; coffee; tea; soap bars; cleaning products
- Parent: DFTBA Records
- Website: good.store

Good Store is an American e-commerce company founded by the Green brothers (Hank and John Green). Originally a sock subscription service, the company sells everyday products such as coffee, tea, soap, and eco-friendly cleaning supplies.

All profits generated by the company are donated to charity partners, primarily Partners in Health. As of August 2025, Good Store had donated over $10 million.

== History ==
=== Origin ===
Good Store was founded in 2023 by the Green brothers, Hank and John Green. The primary intent of the company was to raise funds for a new maternal health center in Sierra Leone. This was part of the brothers' larger fundraising commitment to Partners in Health, which was announced in 2019 and consisted of raising $25 million over the following five years. To raise a portion of these funds, the brothers decided to sell products using the existing infrastructure of their merchandise company DFTBA Records (based in Missoula, Montana) and donate all profits in a business model inspired by Newman's Own.

"The deal is that we break even, and the rest of the money goes to charity."

— John Green on the business model of Good Store (2025)

Hank purchased the good.store domain name years before its launch, hoping to eventually sell multiple products as a more ethical alternative to Amazon. Initial funding for the project came from the brothers and investments from a few close friends. On their decision to donate all profits, Hank said, "making more money for ourselves wasn't especially motivating [...] But building a business that could turn ordinary purchases into real-world impact [felt exciting]."

=== Individual subscription services (2020–2023) ===
In November 2020, Hank Green announced the "Awesome Socks Club", a subscription service in which members receive a pair of socks each month designed by independent artists. All post-tax profits were donated to Partners in Health to support maternal health in Sierra Leone. Most of the marketing for Awesome Socks Club consisted of partnerships with TikTok influencers and videos on Hank's own TikTok account.

The brothers started the "Awesome Coffee Club" in March 2022 with the same goal and business model. The coffee is ethically sourced from Colombia via the brothers' sourcing partner, Sucafina. The beans are then roasted in St. Louis, Missouri, and distributed through DFTBA's fulfillment center in Missoula, Montana. Hank Green reported in mid-2022 that the Awesome Socks Club had over 40,000 subscribers and the Awesome Coffee Club had over 10,000.

A third charitable sub-brand, "Sun Basin Soap", was launched in April 2023. The soap and shampoo bars are made by Botanie Soap, a family-run business near Good Store's headquarters in Missoula.

=== Good Store brand and continued expansion (2023–present) ===
The subscriptions were brought under the common branding of "Good.Store" (also called Good Store) soon after Laura Joukovski became CEO in August 2023. Later that year, Hank Green announced that he had designed a new line of socks for Good Store called "Hank's Cancer Socks" while undergoing treatment for Hodgkin lymphoma. Proceeds from this line went to increasing access to cancer treatment. John Green reported that the cancer socks campaign raised $350,000 for Partners in Health.

In June 2024, the Awesome Coffee Club rebranded to "Keats & Co" and began selling loose leaf tea in addition to coffee. Profits from Keats & Co go toward the work of Partners in Health to treat and prevent tuberculosis in Lesotho. Keats & Co is named after poet John Keats, who died of tuberculosis. In March 2025 the company launched a line of curated eco-friendly cleaning products called EcoGeek. The name EcoGeek calls back to the original name of the Green brothers' the educational video company Complexly. Profits from this line are donated to the Coral Reef Alliance. The same year, Good Store launched an underwear subscription called the "Awesome Undies Club" in partnership with Culver City, California-based brand MeUndies.

As of August 2025, Good Store had donated over $10 million in operating profits, including $75,000 donated to the Coral Reef Alliance from EcoGeek sales.
