= Fretless – The Wrath of Riffson =

2025 video game

- Developer: Ritual Studios
- Publisher: Playdigious Originals
- Platform: Windows
- Release: July 17, 2025
- Genres: Role-playing, deck-building, rhythm
- Mode: Single-player

Fretless – The Wrath of Riffson is a 2025 role-playing video game developed by Ritual Studios and published by Playdigious Originals. Its turn-based combat combines deck-building with timed rhythm game inputs. The player controls Rob, a musician who enters a Battle of the Bands while opposing Rick Riffson, the head of the exploitative Super Metal Records. The game was released for Windows on July 17, 2025.

The game received mixed or average reviews, with critics generally praising its use of music, pixel-art presentation, and instrument-based combat systems, while disagreeing about its difficulty and criticizing aspects of its pacing and story. It was nominated for Debut Game at the 2025 Indie Game Awards.

== Gameplay ==
Fretless is presented from a top-down perspective in a pixel-art world built around musical imagery. Rob travels through towns and several wilderness regions, speaks with non-player characters, finds hidden items, and solves simple environmental puzzles. The story leads him toward a Battle of the Bands organized by Super Metal Records, whose contracts allow Rick Riffson to take control of musicians' work.

Combat is turn-based. Abilities called riffs function as cards in a deck, from which the player selects up to three actions during a turn. Riffs can attack, create shields, restore health, or apply status effects, and their order can produce combinations. Timed inputs increase outgoing damage or reduce incoming damage; a separate Crescendo meter enables a longer rhythm sequence when filled. The timing requirements can be made easier or disabled.

Rob can use four instruments: an acoustic guitar, bass guitar, synthesizer, and eight-string electric guitar. Each has a distinct deck and central mechanic. For example, the synthesizer emphasizes status effects, while the eight-string exchanges Rob's health for stronger attacks. Instruments can be customized with components such as strings, bridges, pickups, and effects pedals, which modify abilities and passive effects.

== Development and release ==
Fretless is the debut game of the independent developer Ritual Studios. It was announced by Ritual Studios and Playdigious during the Future Games Show Summer Showcase on June 10, 2023, initially with a planned 2024 release. Its world and protagonist were inspired by musician and online creator Rob Scallon.

Ritual Studios engineering designer Maximilian Lubbers said that the team combined deck-building and turn-based combat to provide strategy, then added timing challenges to retain the skill component expected of a music game. Artist Connor Smith said the developers applied the musical theme throughout the environments, enemies, equipment, and currency. Guest musicians on the soundtrack include King Yosef, Ola Englund, Northlane, Cult of Luna, Andrew Huang, and Yvette Young.

Playdigious later scheduled the Windows version for May 22, 2025, before delaying it to that summer. The final July 17 release date was announced in June.

== Reception ==
Reception

Aggregate score
Aggregator	Score
Metacritic	73/100

According to review aggregator Metacritic, Fretless received "mixed or average" reviews, with a score of 73 out of 100 based on 13 critic reviews.

Kenneth Shepard of Kotaku praised the way musical composition informed both the deck-building mechanics and world design. He found the four instruments mechanically distinct and the timing system clearly communicated, while noting occasional bugs. Cosmin Vasile of Softpedia gave the game 8 out of 10, commending its music, pixel-art environments, combat, and instrument customization. He considered it accessible and estimated a seven-to-ten-hour length, but criticized repetitive encounters, loading times, and a linear story. Moisés Valderas of ElDesmarque also scored it 8 out of 10, praising the energy and music of its combat while describing the story as simple and the learning curve as potentially frustrating.

Darren Forman of GameCritics.com was more negative, awarding the game 4 out of 10. He praised its combat animation but found the battles too easy and slow, and criticized the limited character development and a late stealth sequence.

=== Accolades ===
Fretless was nominated for the "Debut Game" award at the 2025 Indie Game Awards.
