= Rob Scallon =

American musician and YouTuber (born 1990)

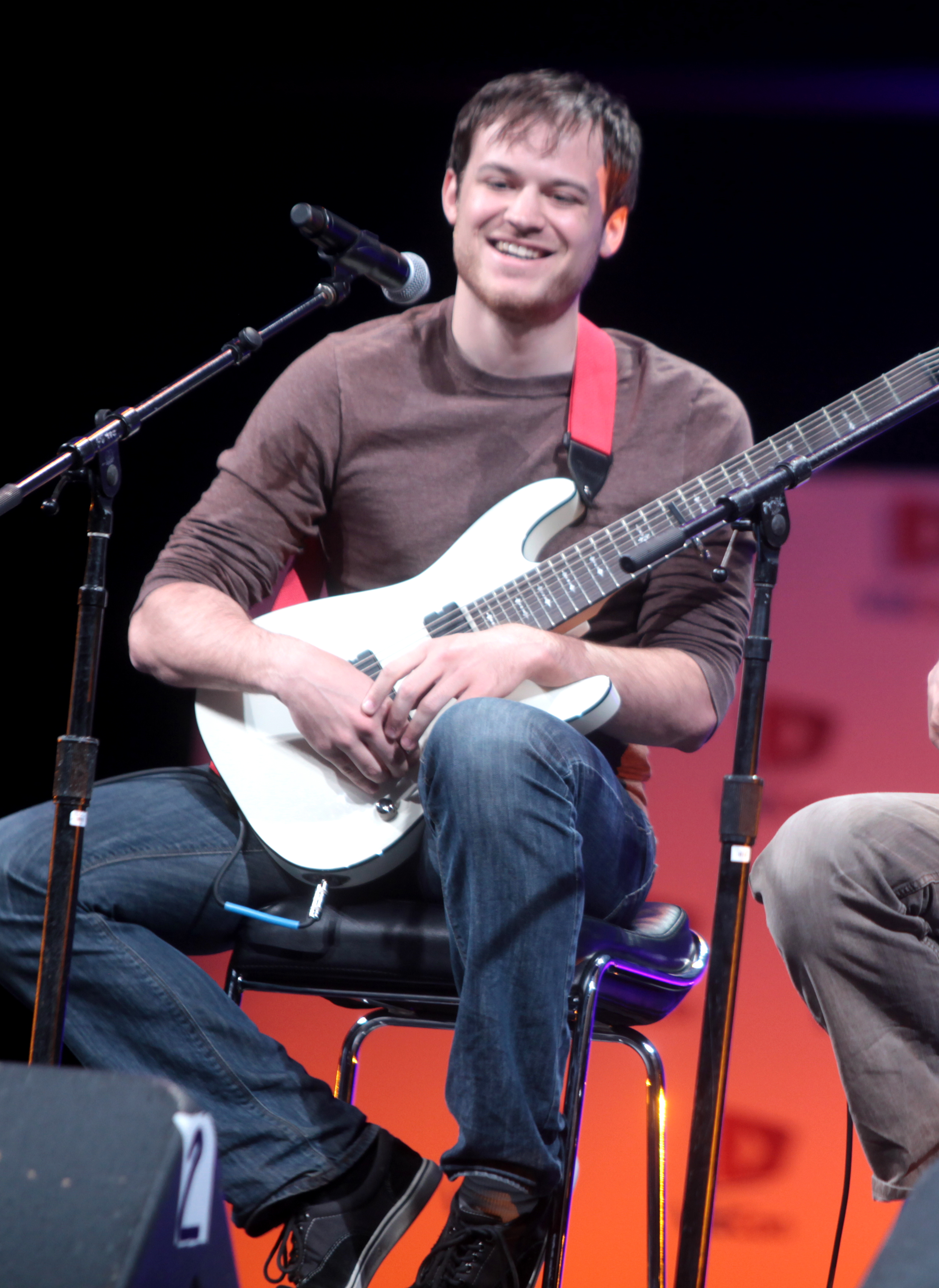
- Scallon at VidCon in 2014

Background information
- Born: Robert Andrew Scallon; August 26, 1990 (age 36); Champaign, Illinois, U.S.
- Origin: Arlington Heights, Illinois, U.S.
- Genres: Heavy metal; alternative metal; djent; indie rock; experimental; emo; folk; post-rock
- Occupations: Musician; video producer; internet personality
- Instruments: Guitar; drums; bass; ukulele; banjo; cello; vocals
- Years active: 2007–present
- Label: DFTBA
- Member of: Hank Green and the Perfect Strangers; First of October
- Spouse: Tamara Chambers (m. 2020)

YouTube information
- Channel: Rob Scallon
- Genres: Vlog; music; comedy
- Subscribers: 2.77 million
- Views: 891.3 million
- Last updated: November 3, 2026

Robert Andrew Scallon (born August 26, 1990) is an American YouTuber, musician, and multi-instrumentalist based in Chicago, Illinois. He is best known for several viral videos featuring his music, including heavy metal songs played with traditionally non-metal instruments.

== Early life ==
Scallon was born on August 26, 1990, in Champaign, Illinois, and was raised in Arlington Heights, Illinois. As a child, he and his friends would visit their local Guitar Center and play instruments, although would never buy any due to lack of money. He was given his first guitar, a nylon-string classical, as a gift from his friend's father. He used it to write his first solo songs and it was featured in many of his early videos.

As a teenager, Scallon played drums in a metal band called Gas Mask Catalogue.

== Career ==
=== YouTube career ===
Scallon performing on a Cristal Baschet, 2022

Scallon began uploading to YouTube in February 2007, and began to develop a following in 2008. His popularity launched as he began to cover metal songs with folk and country instruments. Most notable are his renditions of songs on banjo, including "Raining Blood" by Slayer, "Master of Puppets" by Metallica, and "Psychosocial" by Slipknot, the latter featuring a cameo appearance by Corey Taylor. His videos have featured collaborations with Andrew Huang, Boyinaband, Davie504, Doug Walker, Jared Dines, Leo Moracchioli, Mary Spender, Sarah Longfield, Michael Angelo Batio, and Alex Rüdinger.

Scallon is also part of two collaborative projects with Andrew Huang. The first is called First of October, a novelty band that records an album within one recording session every October 1. The second is called Sonic Boom, a YouTube music show where the pair take on a variety of musical challenges, often utilizing unusual instruments, time limits for creating full songs, and other factors.

=== Music career ===
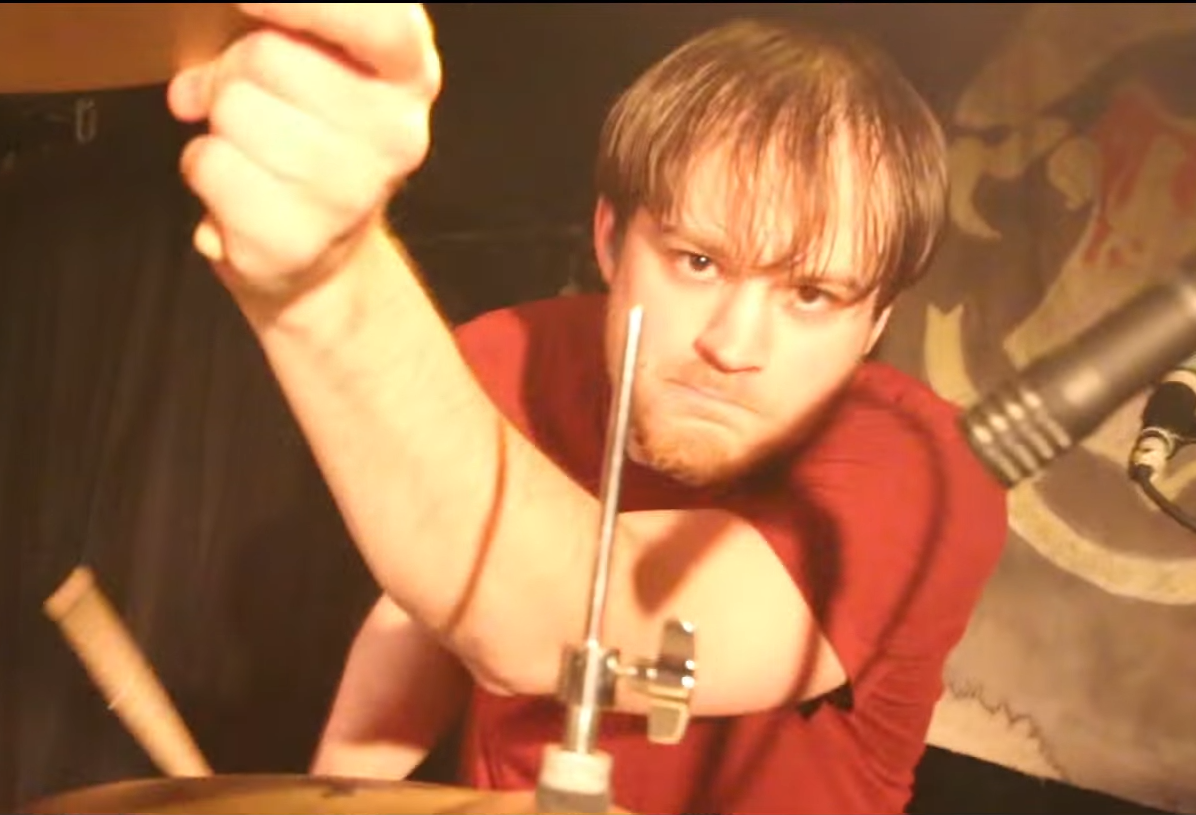
Scallon with the Perfect Strangers in 2016

Scallon has released several solo albums. While most are self-released, his EP Anchor and LP The Scene is Dead are sold through DFTBA Records. His releases have featured instrumentalists such as Jeff Loomis, Rabea Massaad, Ola Englund, and Pete Cottrell. He plays drums in the band Hank Green and the Perfect Strangers, and their debut album Incongruent peaked at number 3 on the Billboard Comedy Albums chart in 2014.

Scallon released a signature series of guitars with Chapman Guitars in 2017. Three more guitars were added to his line in 2020. In 2022, Scallon ended his partnership with Chapman and launched a new line of guitars with Schecter.

Scallon, in partnership with Sweetwater Sound, received a Guinness World Record for the largest guitar effect pedalboard in 2019. The rig included 319 individual pedals, 34 pedalboards, and over 500 feet (150 m) of cables. On January 1, 2021, Scallon launched GuitarQuest, a paid online course to teach people how to play guitar. Later that year, he released the song "MudHook" featuring Unearth drummer Nick Pierce.

On September 26, 2024, Scallon released Crowded Rooms, an album mixing heavy metal and Midwest emo.

=== Video game development ===
On June 10, 2023, Scallon announced a partnership with Ritual Studios to produce the pixel-art adventure game Fretless – The Wrath of Riffson. The protagonist and setting were inspired by Scallon. The game combines rhythm-based combat with RPG elements. Australian industrial metal band Northlane contributed to the soundtrack. It was released for Windows on July 17, 2025, and received "mixed or average" reviews according to Metacritic.

== Personal life ==
Scallon's younger brother, John, also played music as a teenager. He left his instruments behind for Rob when leaving for college. Several instruments in Scallon's personal collection are custom made through collaborations with other content creators.

Scallon began dating actress, comedian, and YouTuber Tamara Chambers in 2012. They married in November 2020. They have collaborated on various projects, such as a 2012 Good Mythical Morning episode introduction and a 2014 cover of Pharrell's "Happy".

In July 2024, Scallon uploaded a video confirming that he has bipolar I disorder, having been diagnosed with it the previous year.

== Discography ==
Studio albums

- Summer (2008)
- The Ride Home (2009)
- The Winter's Months (2011)
- Rob Scallon (2012)
- Aldine (2014)
- The Scene Is Dead (2017)
- Crowded Rooms (2024)

Extended plays

- A Purple Cello EP (2013)
- Anchor (2014)
- Metal Mad Libs 1-6 (with Eddie Guillen) (2016)
- Sunday Uke Group (2018)

Singles

- "Anchor" (2013)
- "We Wish You A Backwards Christmas" (2013)
- "Musical Mad Libs" (ft. Tamara Chambers) (2014)
- "Musical Mad Libs 3 - #Swagyolo" (ft. Tamara Chambers) (2014)
- "iPhone Beard Metal" (2014)
- "A Collapse" (2014)
- "Procrastination Bass'in" (2014)
- "The Wheezy Song" (2014)
- "A Westbound Train" (2014)
- "Frantic Disembowelment (ukulele cover)" (2014)
- "Raining Blood (banjo cover)" (2014)
- "War Ensemble (ukulele cover)" (2014)
- "Aerials (cello cover)" (2014)
- "Chop Suey (cello cover)" (2014)
- "Spill The Blood (cello cover)" (2014)
- "Progressive Metal Town" (2014)
- "Homehomehome" (2014)
- "Metal in Inappropriate Places (ft. Fluff)" (2014)
- "Angel of Death (Banjo cover)" (2014)
- "A Half Hour of Acoustic Guitar" (2014)
- "I Fucking Love Christmas (ft. Doug Walker)" (2014)
- "Envy" (2014)
- "Torque Soul" (2015)
- "Royale" (2015)
- "Half Hour of 12 String Guitar" (2015)
- "Sunken Ships" (2016)
- "Unconditional" (2016)
- "A False Closeness" (2016)
- "Master of Puppets" (Banjo cover ft. Leo Moracchioli) (2016)
- "Harp Metal" (2016)
- "Ragtime" (2016)
- "Sitar Metal" (2017)
- "Everything Song" (2017)
- "Psychosocial" (Banjo cover ft. Leo Moracchioli) (2017)
- "Rain (Live & Acoustic)" (2018)
- "Balalaika Metal" (2018)
- "The Heaviest Matter of the Universe" (Banjo cover ft. Leo Moracchioli) (2018)
- "Djazz" (2018)
- "I Should Spend More Time With You" (ft. Mary Spender) (2018)
- "Amy's Song" (ft. Mary Spender) (2018)
- "Theorbo Metal" (2019)
- "Don't Go" (ft. Andrew Huang and Brandon Acker) (2019)
- "Rich & Sad (Double-Sided Guitar)" (ft. Mary Spender) (2020)
- "Anchor" (ft. Jessica Burdeaux) (2021)
- "MudHook" (ft. Nick Pierce) (2021)
- "Slappity Slappity Slap" (ft. Jessica Burdeaux) (2021)
- "Mutter (Live)" (2021)
- "Song for Some Friends" (2022)
- "Unconditional" (ft. Jessica Burdeaux and Rasheed Thomas) (2022)
- "Keys to the Lamborghini" (ft. Michael Angelo Batio) (2024)
- "Psychosis" (ft. Alex Rüdinger) (2024)
- "I Fucking Hate Traffic" (ft. Tamara Chambers, Alex Rüdinger, and Lwandile Prusent) (2024)

Collaborations

- "Told Me" (2012) – Gunnarolla (feat. Rob Scallon)
- "Guitar Warfare" (2014) - Todd Bryanton (feat. Rob Scallon)
- "Six Inches" (2014) – Gunnarolla (feat. Ally Rhodes & Rob Scallon)
- "Tines" (2017) – Andrew Huang & Rob Scallon
- "Advice" (2018) – Cal Chuchesta (feat. Rob Scallon)
- Nostalgia Critic's The Wall (2019) – Doug Walker

with Gas Mask Catalogue

- Blind. Deaf. Mute. (2009)
- Promise Land (2010)

with Hank Green and the Perfect Strangers

- Incongruent (2014)

with First of October

- Ten Hours (2018)
- Gourmet Ravioli (2019)
- Gotta Record Everything Good (2021)
- CHAOS (2022)
- Across The Road (2023)
- Round 6 (2024)
- One Week (2025)
- A Future Without You (2026)

with Sonic Boom

- "Slide With You" (2023)
- "Que Pasa" (2023)
- "Protect Your Neck" (2023)
- "we had to shed our skins when we saw the other sun" (2023)
- "i'm here whenever you need me" (2023)
- "Silence" (2023)
- "If I Die Tonight" (2023)
- "Pizza Blades" (2024)
- "Gone" (2024)
- "Dead To Me/Love Klutz" (2024)
- "Reality" (2024)
- "Cute Murderous Kittens" (2024)
- "Clouds in the Ocean" (2024)
- "Flippin' Out!" (2024)
