= Austin Jones (musician) =

American musician and convicted sex offender

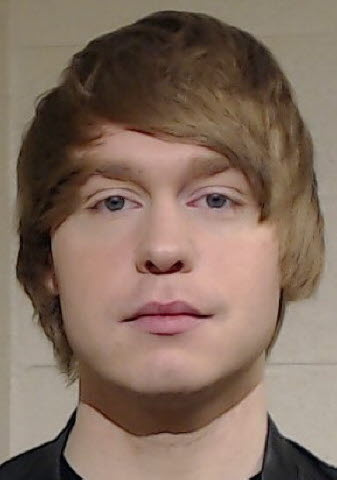
- Jones in 2020
- Born: Austin Henry Jones; December 12, 1992 (age 33); Chicago, Illinois, U.S.
- Occupation: Musician
- Years active: 2007–2017
- Criminal charge: Receipt of child pornography
- Criminal penalty: 10 years in federal prison
- Criminal status: Incarcerated at Federal Correctional Institution, Loretto. Earliest possible release date December 31, 2027.

YouTube information
- Genres: Music (cover music, emo, pop punk)
- Subscribers: 440,000+
- Views: 41.4 million+

Austin Henry Jones (born December 12, 1992) is an American former musician and convicted child sex offender, who was active as a YouTuber from 2007 to 2017, prior to his conviction for receipt of child pornography in 2019.

He accumulated around 540,000 subscribers and over 20 million video views on YouTube up to his arrest. On February 6, 2019, all his social media accounts were terminated before being reinstated on December 25th, 2024. On May 3, 2019, Jones was sentenced to 10 years in federal prison for receipt of child pornography.

== Career ==
Jones began releasing music in 2007 and started writing his own material in 2010. In 2014, he released an EP titled We'll Fall Together, which ended up at number 12 on the iTunes pop chart. In 2016, Jones released a full-length album titled Pitch Imperfect. Jones also made videos of a cappella covers of songs by various alternative bands, such as My Chemical Romance's "Welcome to the Black Parade", Pierce the Veil's "King for a Day", Panic! at the Disco's "I Write Sins Not Tragedies", Fall Out Boy's "Sugar, We're Goin Down" and Twenty One Pilots' entire Blurryface album.

== Controversy and incarceration ==
In May 2015, a Change.org petition was started by an anonymous 15-year-old girl to revoke his planned participation in the upcoming Vans Warped Tour due to inappropriate messages that were discovered of him asking female fans as young as 13 to send videos of themselves twerking. The petition did not accumulate enough signatures, but Jones eventually withdrew from the tour and addressed them in a video he uploaded to his channel, "Setting the Record Straight". He admitted that the messages were authentic and apologized for his actions, while denying that nudity was involved in any of the videos he recorded or any of the webcam conversations.

On June 9, 2017, a United States Magistrate Judge signed a search warrant for Jones' residence in Bloomingdale, Illinois. On June 12, 2017, Homeland Security Investigations executed that search warrant. On the same day, Jones was arrested at O'Hare International Airport by agents of U.S. Immigration and Customs Homeland Security Investigations on two counts of producing child pornography (once in 2016 and once in 2017). Jones consented to a search of his phone and signed a written consent form. HSI transported Jones to its offices to conduct a videotaped interview and Jones signed a written Miranda waiver. In each case he persuaded an underage female fan to make sexually explicit videos of herself, according to his directions. At a June 15 court hearing, Jones was released from federal custody to house arrest in his mother's custody after posting a $100,000 bond, but was ordered to abstain from using the internet while he awaited trial.

He pleaded guilty to a single count of "receipt of child pornography" on February 1, 2019, and was sentenced to 10 years in federal prison on May 3, 2019. After a court hearing on May 6, 2019, Jones was given permission to remain under house arrest until he reported to prison on June 28, 2019. On May 14, 2019, a YouTube video was released by YouTuber deefizzy citing evidence implicating Kevin Lyman (founder of Vans Warped Tour), Leslie West (owner of The Rave in Wisconsin) and Bryan Stars in covering up Jones' behavior and actions. As of 2026, he is imprisoned at FCI Loretto. His earliest possible release date is listed as December 31, 2027.

== Discography ==
- Out of Character (2010)
- From Under the Covers (2011)
- Out of Character 2.0 (2012)
- We'll Fall Together (2013)
- Pitch Imperfect (2016) written by Brigitte Guitart

== See also ==
- Mike Lombardo, another American musician and YouTuber who was convicted of child pornography charges
