= Mike Lombardo =

American former piano rock musician (born 1988)

- Also known as: Michael Lawrence MikeLombardoMusic
- Born: Michael Lawrence Lombardo; March 30, 1988 (age 38); Rome, New York, U.S.
- Genre: Rock
- Occupations: Singer-songwriter, audio systems engineer
- Instruments: Piano, guitar, violin, drums
- Years active: 2008–2012
- Label: Unsigned

Michael Lawrence Lombardo (born March 30, 1988) is an American former musician, sound engineer, and convicted sex offender. He was known for writing piano-driven rock songs and posting them on YouTube under the username "MikeLombardoMusic", until his 2013 conviction on child pornography charges. He was previously signed to DFTBA Records through which he released one LP, Songs for a New Day, and one EP, The Alchemist. Lombardo posted music videos, song tutorials, and personal updates on his YouTube channel which had over 20,000 subscribers before its closure.

As of August 16, 2018, Lombardo was released from FCI Fort Dix, having served a five-year sentence at the facility after pleading guilty to child pornography charges.

== Musical background ==
Lombardo frequently states that he has been making music since he was two years old. He graduated a year early from Berklee College of Music in 2009, earning a degree in songwriting. He first started uploading original songs on YouTube as a way to post his homework for class assignments.

== Child pornography charges ==
On February 16, 2012, it was announced by The Smoking Gun that Lombardo "is the target of a federal child pornography investigation focusing on his alleged exchange of naked photos with underage female fans." Two days after the release of the article, Hank Green, one of the co-owners of DFTBA Records, put up a statement on his Tumblr blog stating that the company had removed Lombardo's music from their website because they "didn't feel it appropriate to continue our business relationship given the situation." On July 20, 2012, a complaint was filed in the United States District Court for the Northern District of New York claiming four counts of child pornography related crimes. He was arrested on July 25, 2012, but released from custody after five days.

On September 18, 2013, The Smoking Gun published another article announcing that Lombardo had pleaded guilty to receipt of child pornography. According to the plea bargain, Lombardo solicited pornographic images from six different minors.

On February 28, 2014, Lombardo was sentenced to five years in federal prison. He was released on August 16, 2018.

== Later career ==
Following his release from prison in 2018, Lombardo began working professionally under his first and middle name, Michael Lawrence. He became the technical editor for Live Sound International and ProSoundWeb, and a product manager for Rational Acoustics.

From 2019 to September 2023, he co-hosted the Signal to Noise podcast along with Kyle Chirnside and Christopher Leonard on ProSoundWeb.

== Committee work and publications ==
Lombardo is a member of the Audio Engineering Society (AES) Technical Committee on Acoustics and Sound Reinforcement. In May 2020, he contributed to the AES Technical Document AESTD1007.1.20-05, which established guidelines for managing sound exposure and noise pollution at large-scale outdoor events. He also serves on the working group for the AES Health and Hearing in Live Audio (HELA) certification scheme.

In 2022, Lombardo published the book Between the Lines: Concepts in Sound System Design and Alignment, which focuses on the practical application of sound system optimization.

== Awards, achievements, and appearances ==
- Lombardo won 1st place in the jazz category of the 2008 Upstate NY Songwriting competition.
- In March 2010, Lombardo earned the title of Master of Song Fu after winning Quick Stop Entertainment's Masters of Song Fu songwriting competition with his song "This Song Is Meta (And So Is This Title)".
- Lombardo wrote a parody of Coldplay's Viva La Vida in homage to Stephen Fry called "Viva La Fry", and it garnered Fry's attention.
- Lombardo, along with his band, The Mike Lombardo Trio, opened for pop musician Ryan Cabrera on his US tour in Hamden, Connecticut on December 6, 2010.
- Lombardo's video "Mike Lombardo Smackdown", about Internet file sharing and piracy was awarded Video of the Year 2010 by the website MusicTechPolicy.com.
- Lombardo has collaborated with many artists, including Meghan Tonjes, on Sara Bareilles' song "King of Anything", which Bareilles watched and commented on.
- Another video, titled "Songwriting on the Floor: Rhyme (And Why Eminem Is Awesome)," was featured on CBSnews.com in May 2011.
- His cover of They Might Be Giants' song "My Man" was included on the "Mink Car Cover" project organized to raise money for the New York Fire Department, in honor of the 10-year anniversary of the release of They Might Be Giants' album Mink Car. This album featured work done by other artists such as Hank Green, Molly Lewis, MC Frontalot, and more.
- During the late summer of 2011, Lombardo toured with nerdcore rapper MC Frontalot as his keyboardist under the stage-name "56K". This tour saw Lombardo play live in front of the sold-out crowd at Penny Arcade Expo, in Seattle, Washington, sharing the main stage with other artists, such as Paul and Storm and Jonathan Coulton.
- In the fall of 2011, Lombardo opened a handful of shows for comedy duo, Paul and Storm.
- In October 2011, Lombardo traveled with MC Frontalot as the band's Front of House sound engineer.

== Discography ==
- The Fordham Sessions (2010)
- Songs for a New Day (2010)
- The Alchemist (2011)
- Alive in Philly (2011) – Live album recorded at Milkboy Coffee in Ardmore, Pennsylvania.

== See also ==
- Austin Jones
