= Federal Correctional Institution, Loretto =

Low-security prison in Pennsylvania, US

Coordinates: 40.496°N 78.622°W

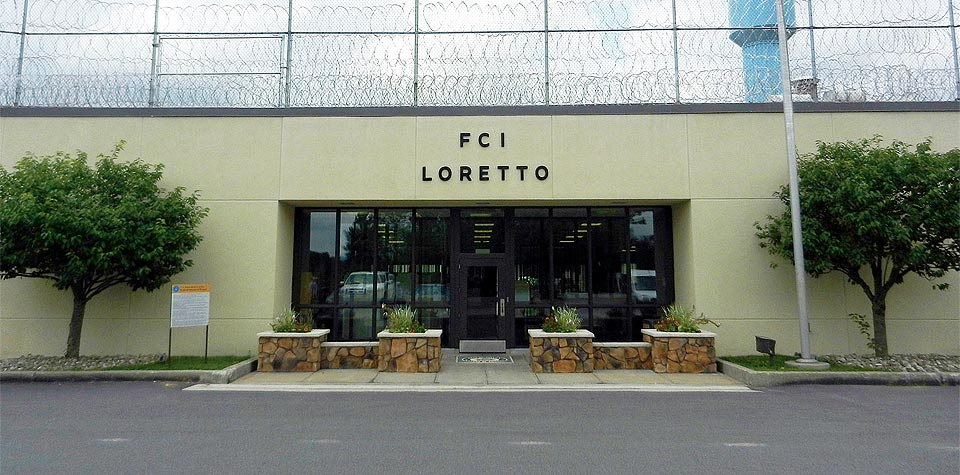
- Interactive map of Federal Correctional Institution, Loretto
- Location: Allegheny Township, Cambria County, near Loretto, Pennsylvania
- Status: Operational
- Security class: Low-security (with minimum-security prison camp)
- Population: 785 (38 in prison camp)
- Opened: 1985
- Managed by: Federal Bureau of Prisons

The Federal Correctional Institution, Loretto (FCI Loretto) is a low-security United States federal prison for male inmates in Pennsylvania. An adjacent satellite prison camp houses minimum-security male offenders. It is operated by the Federal Bureau of Prisons, a division of the United States Department of Justice.

FCI Loretto is located in Allegheny Township, Cambria County, in southwest Pennsylvania, between Altoona and Johnstown, 70 miles (110 km) east of Pittsburgh.

As of 2016, most prisoners have sentences related to illegal drugs. As of that year, the average sentence length is 12 years, and some prisoners are serving life sentences.

== History ==
FCI Loretto was constructed in 1985 on land which was occupied by St. Francis Seminary from the late 1950s to 1979. Fifteen inmates from the federal prison camp at Allenwood, Pennsylvania, assisted in the construction. These inmates included a US Representative involved in the ABSCAM scandal.

By December 2020, nearly 75% of the 856 inmates there were diagnosed with COVID-19. Several inmate family members filed lawsuits in response to reports of substandard living conditions during the pandemic and lack of speed in testing and isolating COVID-19 positive inmates.

== Notable incidents ==
In December 2012, the New York Post and several other media sources reported that Cameron Douglas, the son of film actor Michael Douglas, had suffered a broken leg after being assaulted at the prison. Cameron Douglas was serving a 9-year sentence for drug trafficking, and was located in the Central One Unit. It was reported that an unnamed high-ranking Mafia figure had placed a $100 bounty on him for agreeing to testify against his suppliers, brothers David and Eduardo Escalera. Douglas was later transferred to the Federal Correctional Institution, Cumberland, a medium-security facility in Maryland.

== Facility ==
FCI Loretto has minimal educational opportunities and a drug-abuse treatment program.

Its programs include English as a second language (ESL) and General Education Development (GED) classes. As of 2016, 125 prisoners are in the ESL and/or GED programs.

== Notable inmates (current) ==
Inmate Name	Register Number	Photo	Status	Details
Austin Jones	52069-424		Serving a 10-year sentence; scheduled for release in 2027	Former YouTube star and musician convicted in 2019 of receiving child pornography after requesting underage teenage fans to send pictures and videos of themselves performing sexual acts.
RJ May	89731-511		Serving a 17.5 year sentence	Former member of the South Carolina House of Representatives from 2020-2025 who was convicted of possessing and sending videos of child sexual abuse.
Miguel Rodríguez Orejuela	14022-059		Serving a 30-year sentence; scheduled for release in 2028.	Co-founder of the now-defunct Cali Cartel, which was responsible for as much as 80% of the cocaine brought into the US in the 1970s and 1980s; co-founder Gilberto Rodríguez Orejuela was also serving a 30-year sentence.
Michael Finton	17031-026		Serving a 28-year sentence, scheduled for release on January 11, 2034.	Convicted for attempt to murder, with malice aforethought, at least one US federal officer and employee and an attempt to use a weapon of mass destruction against property owned by the US.

== Notable inmates (former) ==
Inmate Name	Register Number	Photo	Status	Details
William Boyland, Jr.	79751-053		Served a 14-year sentence; released on December 20, 2024.	Former New York State Assemblyman, convicted in 2014 of numerous felony charges related to extortion, bribery, mail fraud, conspiracy and official corruption. On December 12, 2024, Boyland's sentence was commuted by President Joe Biden.
Vincent Asaro	83223-053		Was serving an 8-year sentence; Released on April 20, 2020.	Caporegime in the Bonanno crime family; suspected of participating in racketeering, murder, robbery, extortion, loansharking and gambling; pleaded guilty in 2017 to arson for ordering his underlings to set fire to the car of a motorist who cut him off in traffic in Queens, New York.
Gordon Caplan	86703-054		Released from custody in 2019; served 1 month.	Attorney; pleaded guilty to felony conspiracy to commit mail fraud and honest services mail fraud in connection with 2019 college admissions bribery scandal.
Anthony DiNunzio	97267-012		Released to a halfway house in 2018; serving a 6-year sentence.	Acting boss of the Patriarca crime family in New England since 2009; pleaded guilty in 2012 to racketeering conspiracy for extorting protection payments from adult entertainment businesses in Rhode Island.
Raffaello Follieri	61143-054		Released from custody in 2012; served 4 years.	Ex-boyfriend of actress Anne Hathaway; pleaded guilty to fraud and money laundering for falsely claiming to represent the Vatican in order to persuade investors to give him over $2.4 million.
John Forté	88840-079		Released in 2008 after serving 8 years of a 14 year sentence.	Recording artist; arrested in 2000 after accepting a briefcase containing $1.4 million worth of liquid cocaine; he was convicted and sentenced to the mandatory minimum 14 years after being found guilty, and incarcerated at Loretto. On November 24, 2008, Forté's sentence was commuted by President George W. Bush.
Brian Gunderson	37294-509		Released from Custody in April 2025; served 18 months.	Convicted of trespassing the United States Capitol on January 6, 2021.
John Kiriakou	79637-083		Released from custody in February 2015; served 30 months.	Former CIA officer; pleaded guilty in 2012 to violating the Intelligence Identities Protection Act for disclosing the name of another officer involved in the agency's program to hold and interrogate detainees.
Paul Manafort	35207-016		Was serving a 7.5 year sentence and originally scheduled for official release on Christmas Eve 2024. Released from custody on December 28, 2020.	Former Trump campaign manager, lobbyist, political consultant, and lawyer. Sentenced for lobbying violations and bank and tax fraud. On May 13, 2020, Manafort was released to home confinement due to the threat of COVID-19. On December 23, 2020, Trump issued Manafort a full pardon.
Robel Phillipos	95089-038		Released to a halfway house in 2018; serving a 3-year sentence.	Friend of Boston Marathon Bombing perpetrator Dzhokhar Tsarnaev; convicted in 2014 of making false statements to FBI Agents conducting an investigation of the bombing.
John Rowland	15623-014		Released from custody in 2006; served 10 months.	Governor of Connecticut from 1995 to 2004; pleaded guilty in 2004 to honest services fraud for accepting over $100,000 in gifts and favors from William Tomasso, a contractor who made millions of dollars in state business.

== See also ==
- List of U.S. federal prisons
- Federal Bureau of Prisons
- Incarceration in the United States
