= Hank Green and the Perfect Strangers =

American rock band

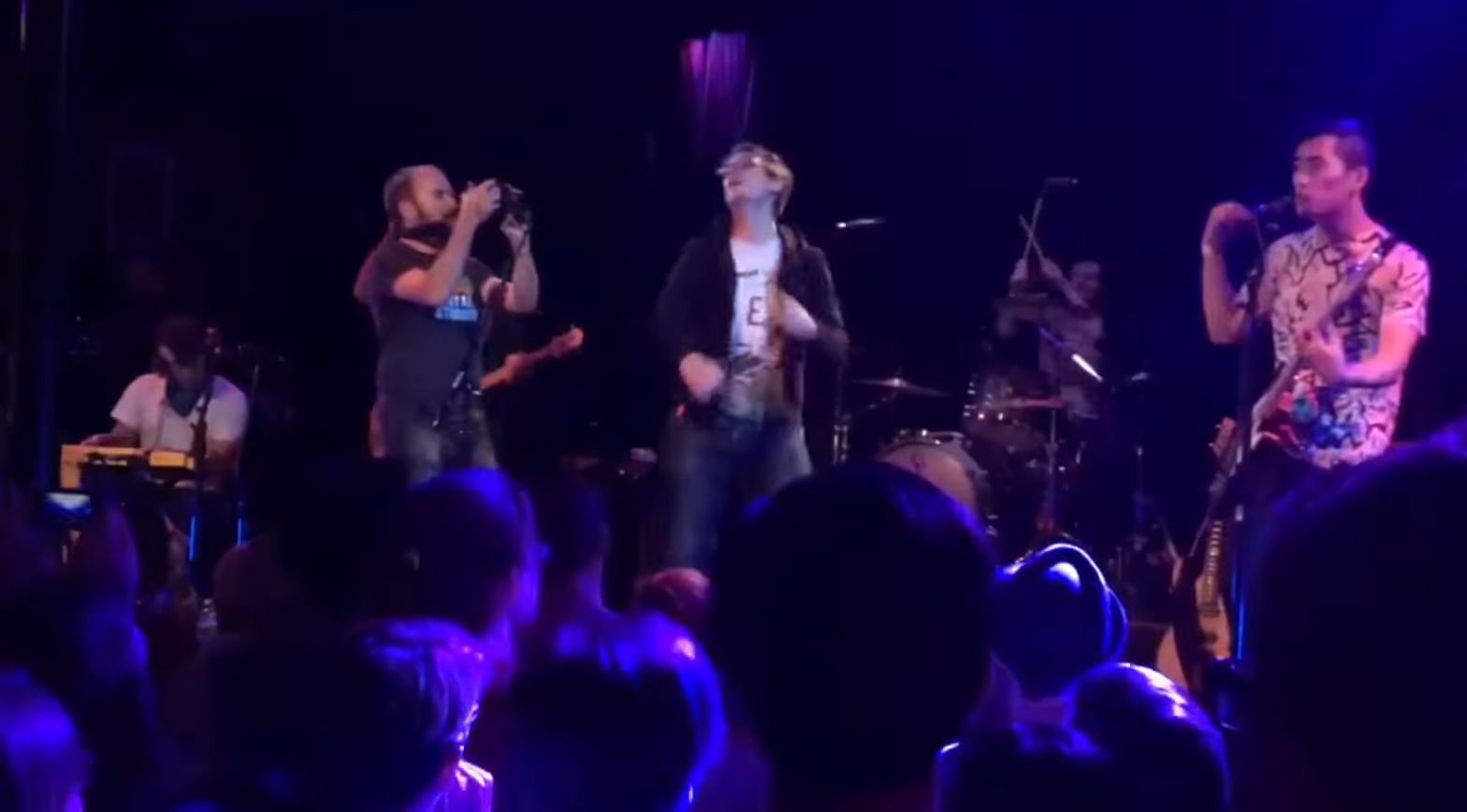
- Hank Green and the Perfect Strangers performing in 2016

Background information
- Genres: Comedy rock; pop rock; punk rock; geek rock
- Years active: 2014–present
- Labels: DFTBA Records
- Members: Hank Green; Rob Scallon; Joe DeGeorge; Andrew Huang

Hank Green and the Perfect Strangers is an American rock band. The band's lineup consists of Hank Green (lead vocals, rhythm guitar), Rob Scallon (drums), Joe DeGeorge (keyboards, saxophone, backing vocals), and Andrew Huang (guitars, bass, vocals). In live performances they are joined by Paul DeGeorge (bass). Their debut album, Incongruent, peaked at number 3 on the Billboard Comedy Albums chart. They have toured alongside acts such as Driftless Pony Club and Harry and the Potters.

Green has cited punk rock acts such as The Mr. T Experience and Green Day as being influential on the band.

== Discography ==
- Incongruent (2014)
