= Allegheny Township, Cambria County, Pennsylvania =

Township in Pennsylvania, US

- Township
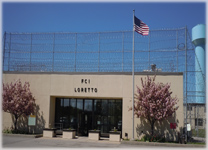
- FCI Loretto in Allegheny Township

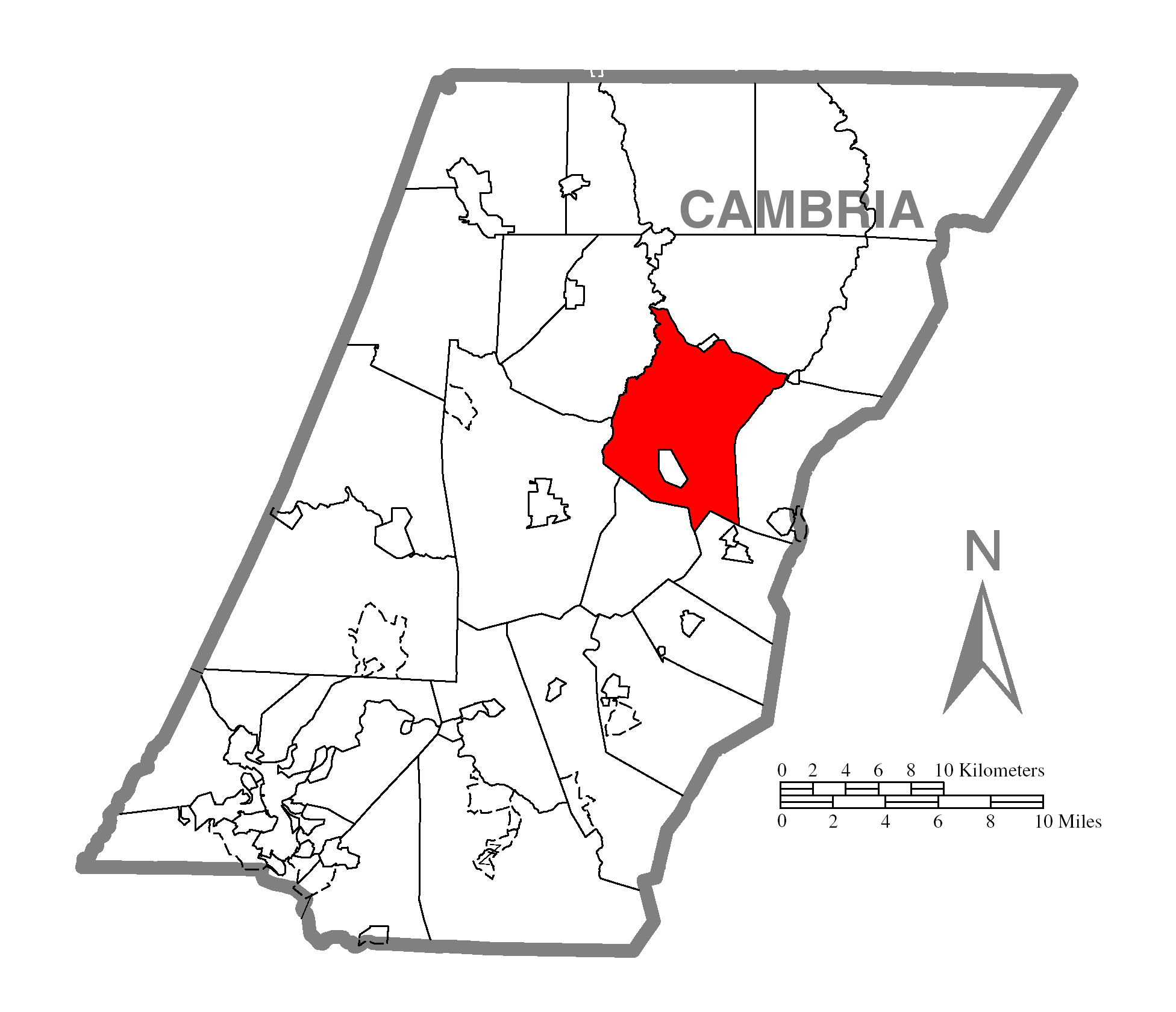
- Map of Cambria County, Pennsylvania highlighting Allegheny Township

- Map of Cambria County, Pennsylvania
- Country: United States
- State: Pennsylvania
- County: Cambria
- Settled: 1788
- Incorporated: 1807

Area
  - Total: 29.39 sq mi (76.13 km^{2})
  - Land: 29.34 sq mi (75.99 km^{2})
  - Water: 0.054 sq mi (0.14 km^{2})

Population (2020)
  - Total: 2,815
  - Density: 95.9/sq mi (37.04/km^{2})
- Time zone: UTC-5 (Eastern (EST))
  - Summer (DST): UTC-4 (EDT)
- Area code: 814
- FIPS code: 42-021-00868

Allegheny Township is a township in Cambria County, Pennsylvania, United States. It is part of the Johnstown, Pennsylvania Metropolitan Statistical Area. The population was 2,815 at the 2020 census, down from 2,851 at the 2010 census.

The township is the site of the Federal Correctional Institution, Loretto.

== History ==
=== Founding ===
The site of Allegheny Township was settled in 1788. The township was incorporated in 1807.

=== 2013 Frew Family shooting ===
On Friday, September 27, 2013, a shooting took place in Allegheny Township on Bottom Road. Three people died on scene and a fourth person was taken to UPMC Altoona but died from complications at the hospital. Roberta Frew answered the door to find her daughter, Josephine Ruckinger, and her son-in-law, Jeff Ruckinger, standing outside the door. Josephine shot Roberta in the chest, killing her instantly. John Frew Jr. attempted to retrieve a gun from a nearby location when he was shot by Jeff. John Frew Sr. then shot the Ruckingers with a .22 caliber revolver. Josephine was transported to UPMC Altoona where she was pronounced dead. John Sr. was injured and taken into police custody for questioning. Josephine had not contacted her family in quite some time, after fleeing with her then boyfriend. John Sr. stated that he didn't recognize Josephine until after she was shot.

== Geography ==
Allegheny Township is located northeast of the center of Cambria County at 40.392581,-78.542633, 18 miles (29 km) west of Altoona. The township surrounds the separate borough of Loretto, and the borough of Chest Springs is along the township's northern border. According to the United States Census Bureau, the township has a total area of 29.4 square miles (76.1 km^{2}), of which 29.3 square miles (76.0 km^{2}) is land and 0.04 square miles (0.1 km^{2}), or 0.18%, is water.

== Communities ==
=== Unincorporated communities ===
- Bradley Junction
- Loretto Road
- Wildwood Springs

== Demographics ==
Historical population
Census	Pop.	Note	%±
2000	2,498		—
2010	2,851		14.1%
2020	2,815		−1.3%

As of the census of 2000, there were 2,498 people, 533 households, and 420 families residing in the township. The population density was 84.6 inhabitants per square mile (32.7/km^{2}). There were 574 housing units at an average density of 19.4/sq mi (7.5/km^{2}). The racial makeup of the township was 81.83% White, 16.01% African American, 0.28% Native American, 1.08% Asian, 0.04% from other races, and 0.76% from two or more races. Hispanic or Latino of any race were 10.33% of the population.

There were 533 households, out of which 37.1% had children under the age of 18 living with them, 67.9% were married couples living together, 7.3% had a female householder with no husband present, and 21.2% were non-families. 19.9% of all households were made up of individuals, and 6.4% had someone living alone who was 65 years of age or older. The average household size was 2.92 and the average family size was 3.38.

In the township the population was spread out, with 16.8% under the age of 18, 8.8% from 18 to 24, 45.8% from 25 to 44, 21.7% from 45 to 64, and 6.9% who were 65 years of age or older. The median age was 36 years. For every 100 females, there were 217.4 males. For every 100 females age 18 and over, there were 264.6 males.

The median income for a household in the township was $41,310, and the median income for a family was $49,271. Males had a median income of $22,961 versus $22,232 for females. The per capita income for the township was $12,911. About 7.1% of families and 10.7% of the population were below the poverty line, including 15.6% of those under age 18 and 14.5% of those age 65 or over.

== Education ==
The township is in the Penn Cambria School District.
