= Corey Vidal =

Canadian YouTuber and entrepreneur

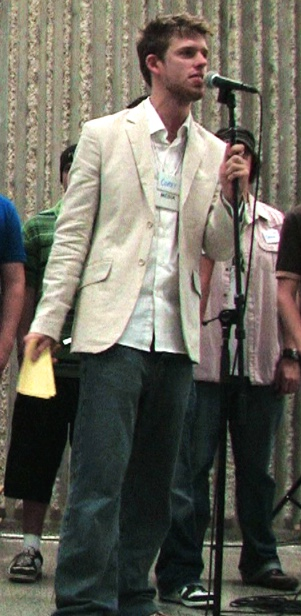
- Corey Vidal hosting the 888 YouTube Gathering in Toronto, 2008
- Born: Corey Steven Vidal; December 7, 1986 (age 39); St. Catharines, Ontario, Canada
- Occupations: YouTuber; entrepreneur

YouTube information
- Channel: Corey Vidal
- Years active: 2006–present
- Genres: Short film; Video blog; Music video
- Subscribers: 207 thousand
- Views: 48.0 million
- Last updated: April 23, 2026

Corey Vidal (born December 7, 1986) is a Canadian YouTube content creator and entrepreneur. His YouTube videos have been seen over 100 million times and he has over 200,000 subscribers. In December 2007, Corey was one of the first Canadians to join the YouTube Partnership Program. In February 2013 he was named Niagara's Entrepreneur of the Year in Innovative Small Business for his video production company ApprenticeA Productions. He is the founder of Buffer Festival.

== YouTube career ==
Corey Vidal began on YouTube in mid-2006 by posting hip hop dance videos inspired by American dance reality television show So You Think You Can Dance. His popularity stemmed from the success of one of his first videos, How To Dance: "1, 2 Step" by Ciara (uploaded to YouTube on September 3, 2006), where he teaches dance steps to R&B singer Ciara's music video 1, 2 Step. The video currently has over 6.5 million views.

Following his How To Dance series, Corey branched into other types of videos. His channel career spans dancing, singing, playing musical instruments, beatboxing, acting in skits and short films (including a short film production by Niagara College), solving Rubik's Cubes, video blogging, and collaborating with other YouTubers. Many of his videos contain references to the Star Wars franchise. Microsoft Canada has contributed to one of Corey's videos, and MTV Europe contacted him to produce an exclusive video to appear in their televised series MTV's Best.Show.Ever in 2007. In December 2008, Corey produced a 4-part a cappella Christmas e-card for California-based consulting firm Barbary Coast Consulting. In May 2009, Vidal released a 33-part interactive choose-your-own-adventure-style video as part of a collaboration with Blendtec, the company behind Will It Blend?. Lucasfilm is now a sponsor of Vidal's channel.

Corey first gained national Canadian media attention in the summer of 2008 when he was announced as the host of the 888 YouTube Gathering that took place August 8, 2008 in Toronto, Ontario, Canada. Corey hosted a one-hour show featuring many of YouTube's most popular "cewebrities", including KevJumba, HappySlip, Dave Days, Charles Trippy, Shay Carl, Philip DeFranco, and more.

Corey Vidal launched a second, daily-vlogging YouTube channel on January 1, 2011, called "ApprenticeEh", where he and the staff members of his company recorded and shared their lives every day. On January 1, 2017, the ApprenticeEh channel ended after 2,192 consecutive days of vlogging. ApprenticeEh operates out of Burlington, Ontario.

Corey appeared in the 2012 edition of the annual Ripley's Believe It or Not! book series for his work on YouTube.

In 2013, ApprenticeA Productions launched Buffer Festival, a film festival catered toward YouTubers.

ApprenticeA Productions partnered with Shay Carl to produce Vlogumentary, a feature-length documentary film about online video fame. It was picked up by Executive Producer Morgan Spurlock and released in 2016 exclusively on YouTube Red.

== Star Wars (John Williams Is The Man) A Cappella Tribute ==
A notable success is his most popular video, a Star Wars a cappella tribute to composer John Williams - a video of Vidal lip-syncing to a song written in 1999 and recorded in 2002 by a cappella comedy troupe Moosebutter. The video was featured on YouTube Canada's homepage on November 3, 2008, and then again on the Worldwide homepage three days later. It appeared on the homepage of MSN.com, and was featured by MSN Videos and StupidVideos.com. As of November 2020, the video has been viewed over 22 million times since its upload on October 27, 2008. The video quickly became Canada's #1 Top Rated (All Time) and #1 Top Favorited (All Time) Entertainment video, and received many other All Time Honors both in Canada and Worldwide. It was also ranked as one of YouTube's Top 100 Rated videos of All Time, although YouTube retired the Honors system in November 2011. The Maclean's Book of Lists named it in their list of '10 Canadian viral sensations' in 2012.

On December 7, 2008, the video was nominated for a 35th Annual People's Choice Awards on CBS as "Favorite User Generated Video" of 2008. It faced competition in its category from other viral videos such as Barack Roll, Fred Goes Swimming, Where the Hell is Matt? (2008), and Wassup 2008. Vidal attended the red carpet event in Los Angeles on January 7, 2009.

== Copyright disputes ==
Corey is known on YouTube for his multiple Digital Millennium Copyright Act (DMCA) disputes between the content in his videos and copyrighted works owned by major studios and labels. To date, he has fought and won every claim made against his videos.

=== 4 Minutes ===
The first claim came from Warner Music Group in April 2008 over the use of Madonna's song 4 Minutes in one of his hip hop dance videos. The video was removed from YouTube by Warner a month after it being uploaded, having received over 200,000 views. Vidal fought Warner with an official DMCA counter-claim, filed through YouTube's copyright system.

Two weeks after his claim was made, Madonna herself uploaded a video to her official YouTube channel titled Madonna's Message To YouTube saying "So all you people out there who are making videos to my single 4 Minutes, keep up the good work. Nice job, nice one, OK. But you got to clean up after yourself, alright?"

Corey forwarded this video to YouTube's copyright department as well as Warner Music Group's legal team, and on May 9, 2008, his video was restored in full, with no penalties held against his account. After a falling-out between YouTube and Warner Music Group in early 2009, Warner pulled down every video on YouTube that contained any of their material. This included a complete purging of Madonna's YouTube account and all her videos, including the official music video to 4 Minutes as well as Madonna's message to YouTube. However, because Corey's claim had legally won in 2008, they were unable to remove his video. It currently has over 4 million views. Madonna's response video has since been restored.

=== John Williams/Star Wars A Cappella Tribute ===
In mid-January 2009, Corey's Star Wars A Cappella video was removed from YouTube due to a DMCA copyright infringement claim by Warner Music Group. His entire account and all of his videos were suspended, then returned three days later, however the a cappella video remained banned and unviewable. For over a month, the official video was unavailable on YouTube, but copies were spread around the Internet by other uploaders on YouTube and other media sites. On February 24, 2009, the original video returned after Corey Vidal fought Warner's claim, citing the video as being protected under fair use. The video was restored with its original views, ratings, and comments.

== Awards and nominations ==
Year	Nominated work	Category	Award	Result
2009	Star Wars (John Williams Is The Man) A Cappella Tribute	Favorite User Generated Video	People's Choice Awards	Nominated
2013	ApprenticeA Productions	Innovative Small Business Award	Niagara Entrepreneur of the Year Awards	Won

== See also ==
- List of YouTube personalities
- User-generated content
- Viral video
