= Craig Benzine =

Filmmaker, comedian, presenter

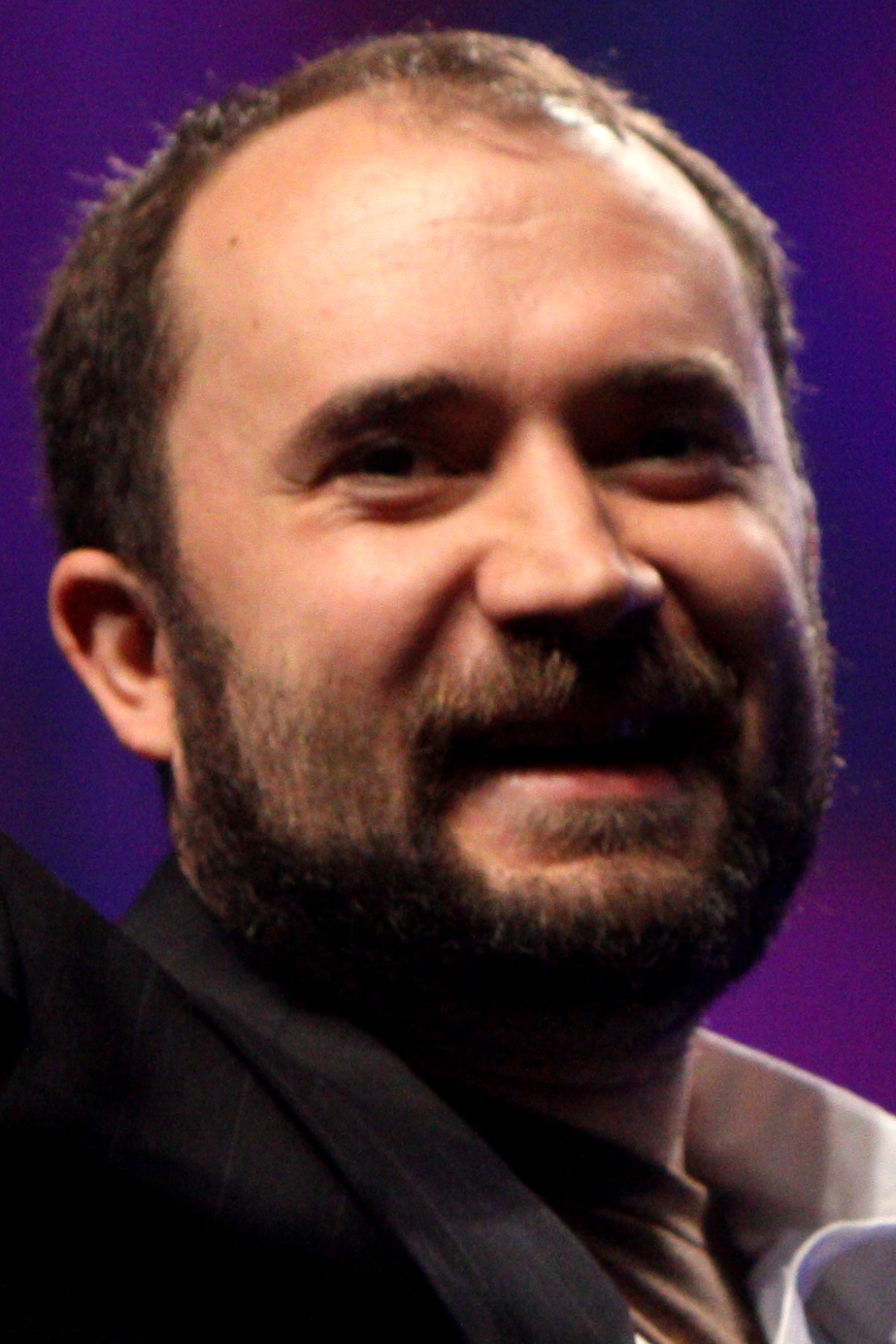
- Benzine at VidCon in 2012
- Born: Craig Gene Benzine; October 5, 1980 (age 45); Marshall, Wisconsin, U.S.
- Spouse: Chyna Pate (m. 2015)
- Children: 1

YouTube information
- Channel: WheezyWaiter
- Years active: 2007–present
- Subscribers: 1.16 million
- Views: 202 million
- Last updated: September 9, 2026
- Website: wheezywaiter.com

Craig Gene Benzine (born October 5, 1980) is an American video producer, musician, and vlogger better known by his YouTube channel name of WheezyWaiter. On July 15, 2020, his channel hit 1 million subscribers and has over 155 million total video views.

On January 23, 2015, Benzine became host of the Crash Course U.S. government and politics series. On April 6, 2017, Benzine became the host of the Film History series.

== Career ==
=== YouTube ===
Benzine started out, together with his fellow Driftless Pony Club band members, on the channel "sambonejr", co-starring in several short comical video clips, of which the first 19 videos were uploaded in March 2006. Together with his friends Zaid Maxwell and Amelia Styer, Benzine also created an album and a movie to the album under the name Ozark Cousins, of which a sample is still commonly used in his WheezyWaiter videos as background music, playing when Craig moves his chair.

After an unprofitable shift in 2007 at the restaurant in Chicago where he worked as a waiter, Benzine's boss told him not to come into work the next day because he doubted there would be enough customers. Benzine, as a result, was worried about how he was going to get money to pay his rent. On his day off, Benzine spent the entire day watching Ze Frank videos on YouTube, and was inspired to start his own vlogging channel. The name "WheezyWaiter" referred to his waiter job at the time and the asthma that he has had since birth. Originally, the vlogs were centred around Benzine's frustrations surrounding his job, but quickly grew to incorporate song parodies, cultural commentaries, and documentation of Benzine's daily life with fictionalized elements added, such as sharing his apartment with a never-ending parade of clones of himself, as well as a whale, David Hasselhoff, and Michael Phelps.

Eventually, Benzine was hired as the video editor for a web development company, and was able to quit his job as a waiter. He continued to produce content for his YouTube channel, despite having a small audience, usually making videos in the morning before going to his office job. In 2013, he was featured in the documentary film Please Subscribe.

Benzine now works professionally as a video editor and vlogger. He continues to upload new content to his main channel, WheezyWaiter's channel on YouTube, as well as to his more personal channel, WheezyNews, and others. On February 16, 2016, he started making videos in the format of daily vlogs instead of his old format. On June 27, 2016, he stopped doing daily lifestyle vlogs and returned to making comedy videos. Following a viral video about quitting sugar released on September 7, 2018, Craig began creating more life improvement content, including challenge videos where he changes something about his life for a month and discusses whether he felt like it was an improvement. His wife, Chyna, often participates in these challenges.

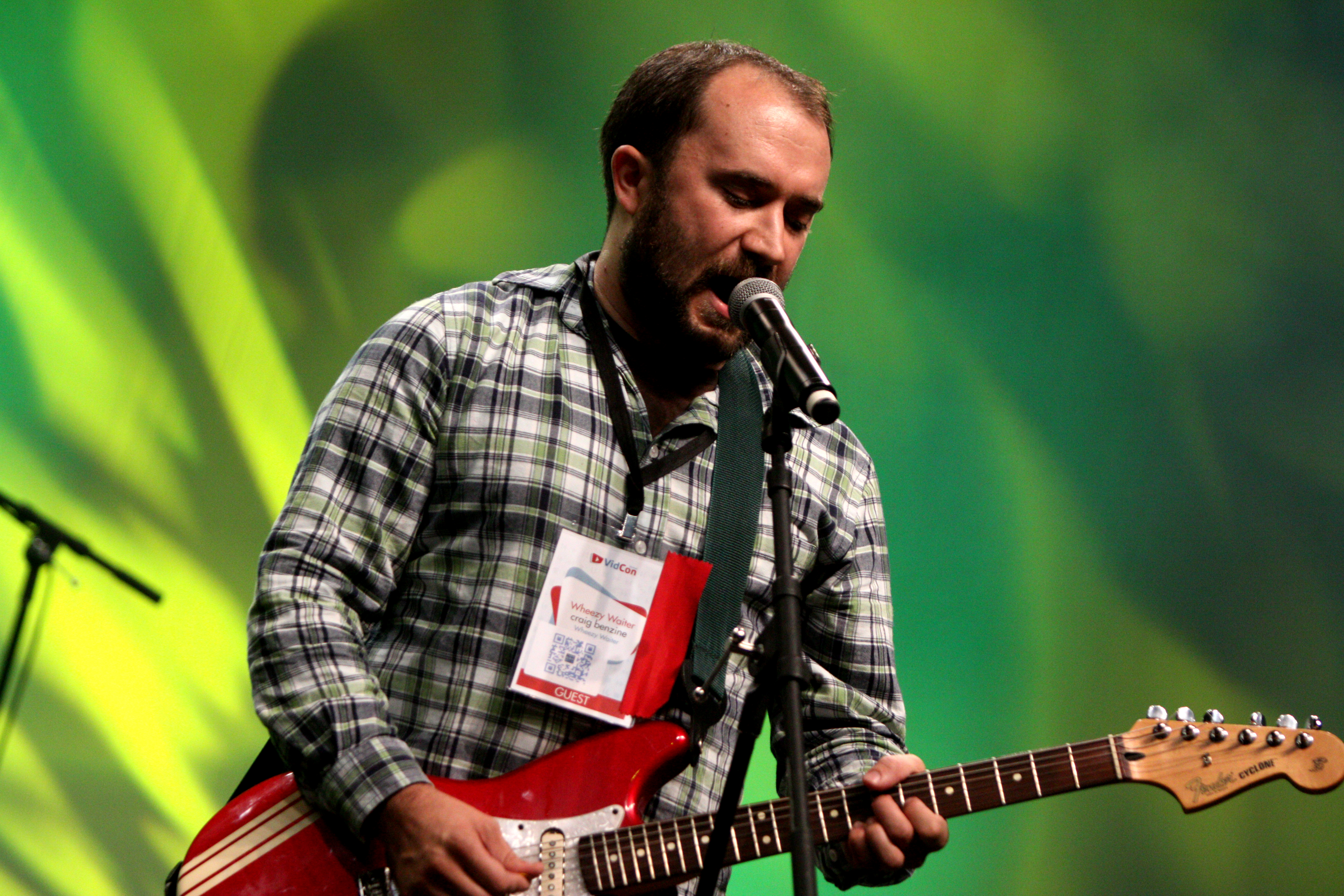
Benzine performing at Vidcon 2012.

=== Driftless Pony Club ===
Together with Matt Weber, Sam Grant and Nate Bartley, Craig is a member of the indie rock band Driftless Pony Club as the lead singer and rhythm guitarist. Both the band and Benzine are signed to DFTBA Records. Driftless Pony Club has six albums available: Janel, Cholera, Expert, Buckminster, Magnicifent, and Zastera. Their song "House of 1982, Built Like a Ship" is the theme song to the webseries, MyMusic, which uses other songs in their library throughout the show.

On May 12, 2016, the band posted a video on their YouTube channel discussing a Kickstarter project initiated to fund the band's vinyl-pressing of their upcoming album, Zastera, in addition to debuting a new song called "Chorus Complains," which appeared on the same album.

On June 14, 2016, the band released their album Zastera digitally on Spotify, Google Play Music, and iTunes.

=== AlgoRhythm ===
On July 27, 2016, Craig Benzine created the webseries AlgoRhythm with New Form Digital to air on Verizon's go90 app. He based this series on Fine Tuned, a short film he created in 2014 starring Brando Crawford. AlgoRhythm is about a man who has to fix an algorithm that predicts how popular a song will be. He teams up with his neighbor, a drummer who recently got dumped and hasn't moved on from his ex. Together they discover different genres of music that they didn't take into account and attempt to reunite the drummer with his girlfriend.

=== The Platoon of Power Squadron ===
He is also a main cast member on The Platoon of Power Squadron, a sporadically-updated webseries on YouTube about superheroes. Benzine plays Donald, a man who can project lightning from his hands.

=== The Good Stuff ===
The Good Stuff is a playlist-based webseries (originally referred to only as a "Secret Project") co-created by Craig Benzine and his friend and bandmate Matt Weber. In February 2013, the first video playlist was uploaded to a new YouTube channel of the same name, "The Good Stuff". The Good Stuff releases playlists of videos of various formats connected by a theme. Themes so far have included "Miniature", "Rockstar Lifestyle", "Origins", "Airplanes", "Time", "Community", and "Geek Week"; the episodes have featured short films, interviews, documentaries and compilations of viewer-submitted content.

=== Big Questions ===
Since 2014, Benzine has hosted a regular feature on the Mental Floss YouTube channel called The Big Question, where fan questions are answered, similar to its magazine counterpart. This feature was later renamed Big Questions.

== Charity work ==
Benzine has participated in and promoted various charity projects. In 2009 and 2010 he promoted Action Against Hunger as his contribution to the Project for Awesome. In 2012 he promoted the project Water.org. On his fourth mission for the Ford Fiesta Movement he organized a poker game to raise money for the Prevent Cancer Foundation.

== Personal life ==
On September 15, 2014, Benzine proposed to his girlfriend, Chyna Pate, in the 1000th episode of Wheezy Waiter, in an idiosyncratic way which involved stringing together the first letters of episode titles to read "Chyna Will You Marry Me?" They married on October 11, 2015, at the Mars Gallery in Chicago. Their honeymoon was in Scotland.

Benzine lived in Chicago for 13 years, but he moved to Austin, Texas, in August 2016. In May 2017, he and Chyna announced they were expecting their first child, a girl named Ada; she was born in November 2017. In March 2018, Craig and his family moved to Madison, Wisconsin, where they currently reside.

== Filmography ==
Year	Title	Role	Notes
2010	The Annoying Orange	Pistachios	Web series; Episode: "Mystery of the Mustachios"
2012	Dr. Fabulous	Octopus Patient	Web series; Episode: "The Beginning"
2013	Versus Valerie	Waiter	Web series: Episode: "The Dark Side vs. Valerie"
2014	Clash at the Cantina	Craig Benzine (self)	Fan film
2014	Whoops	Paul	Short film
2015	Billie Bob Joe	WheezyWaiter	
2015	Oscar's Hotel for Fantastical Creatures	Self (cameo)	Web series
2015	Swift Change of Heart	Employee	Video
2016	Algorhythm	Linus	5 episodes
2009–2017	The Platoon of Power Squadron	Donald / Mr. Dr. Electron	Web series: 10 episodes
2017	The Lion's Blaze	Apples (voice)	Animated short film
2009–2021	F*%ked in Space!	Crew Member	Web series; 8 episodes
2024	Haunt Season	Seth	

== See also ==
- List of YouTube personalities
