= Andrew Huang (musician) =

Canadian musician and YouTuber (born 1984)

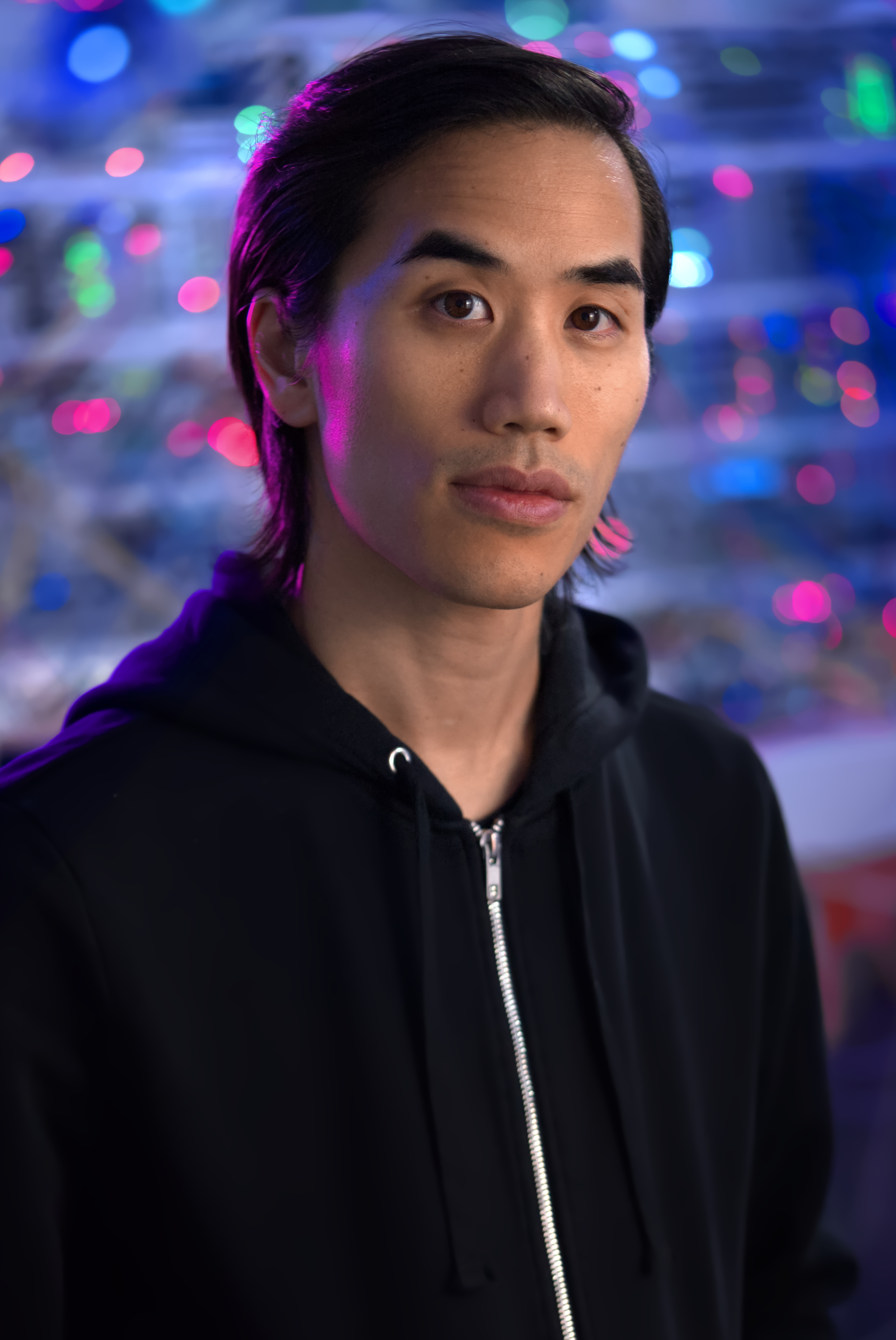
- Huang in 2024

Background information
- Born: Andrew Lewis Huang; April 8, 1984 (age 42); Ottawa, Ontario, Canada
- Genres: Ambient; electronic; pop; hip hop; rock
- Occupations: Musician; video producer; internet personality
- Instruments: Vocals; guitar; keyboards; bass guitar; drums; ukulele; sampler
- Years active: 2003–present
- Member of: Hank Green and the Perfect Strangers; First of October
- Website: Official website

YouTube information
- Channel: andrewhuang
- Genres: Vlog; music; comedy; education
- Subscribers: 2.37 million
- Views: 373.44 million
- Last updated: 9 March 2026

Andrew Lewis Huang (born April 8, 1984) is a Canadian musician, YouTube personality, multi-instrumentalist, and video producer. He (Note: Huang uses any pronouns. This article uses he/him for consistency.) is known for creating music in a wide range of styles and genres, as well as educational videos about music theory and music tools. Popular video series include "Song Challenge", which invites viewers to dare him in feats of musicianship, "4 Producers 1 Sample", in which Huang and three additional music producers typically create their own versions of a song from the same music sample, and "Weird Gear", in which Huang reviews and demos unique music gear. He is also known for several viral videos featuring his music and for his videos where he creates music using sounds from unconventional objects and instruments. Huang has released more than 50 albums of original music independently and through various collaborations, under his own name as well as under various pseudonyms.

As of November 2025, his YouTube channel has accumulated over 367 million views with over 2.37 million subscribers.

== Personal life ==
Andrew Lewis Huang was born on April 8, 1984, in Ottawa, Ontario, where he was also raised. He obtained a Bachelor of Fine Arts at York University studying music before becoming self-employed as a music producer and YouTube personality. At the age of 20, Huang developed a hearing loss issue overnight that medical professionals have been unable to explain. It has resulted in a diminished bass response and reduction in volume in both his ears, and is more pronounced on the right side. Due to this, Huang often seeks help from other producers during the mixing stages of production. He lives in Toronto with his wife Esther and their daughter and son. Huang uses any pronouns.

== Early career ==
After little success finding a part-time job during his university studies, Huang began auctioning off his songwriting skills to the highest bidder on eBay. The winning bidders received a custom song in any genre, written and recorded to their specifications.

In response to the success of the eBay auctions, in April 2004, Huang launched the website Songs To Wear Pants To, where visitors to the site could commission songs based on personal requests. The popularity of the site grew as Huang also began to take on commissions for free, provided the song idea interested him. The free songs often took on a comedic angle, either by poking fun at the person who requested the song, or simply because Huang would choose the most outrageous of submitted ideas to write about. What resulted was an eclectic archive of hip hop, classical, doo wop, electronic, folk, rock and heavy metal tunes performed entirely by Huang.

== YouTube channel ==
In October 2006, Huang started a channel on YouTube and began uploading fan-made music videos for the songs he created through Songs To Wear Pants To. Huang's channel is known for a wide variety of musical genres, influences, and projects, often thematically focused. Huang's videos often feature the artist himself, and frequently aim to showcase various elements of the song.

In November 2010, Huang uploaded the song "Pink Fluffy Unicorns Dancing on Rainbows" (PFUDOR) on his YouTube channel. Inspired by a comment left on a previous YouTube video, it became a viral video. Huang stated that he "never expected [PFUDOR] to be my best-known work". As of November 2025, the song has over 14 million views on Huang's original upload.

Huang is known for his "Song Challenge" series, an extension of the idea behind Songs to Wear Pants To, in which Huang takes on musical challenges submitted by viewers via social media. In 2013, he released a rap song titled "Vass Tunga", written in five different languages.

Huang occasionally uses unusual instruments to record cover versions of songs. One of his early efforts was released a week before AMC's Breaking Bad aired its series finale, featuring a cover of its unsettling title music using clandestine chemistry equipment. Other examples include a cover version of "99 Red Balloons" recorded with balloons, and a cover of The Weeknd's "Can't Feel My Face", using dental instruments filmed in his dentist's office.

In 2016, Huang was signed to the YouTube network Fullscreen. Fullscreen became defunct in October 2021. In 2018, Huang was nominated for an iHeartRadio Music Award in the "Social Star" category.

On March 18, 2021, Huang released a video titled "Final song before I leave" in which he ostensibly claimed that he is leaving Earth to go to space. The video used footage from real rocket launches including the Antares and other doctored images and videos, and was speculated by Newsweek to be promotional for an upcoming music project. The album Spacetime was released on August 20, 2021.

== Collaborations ==
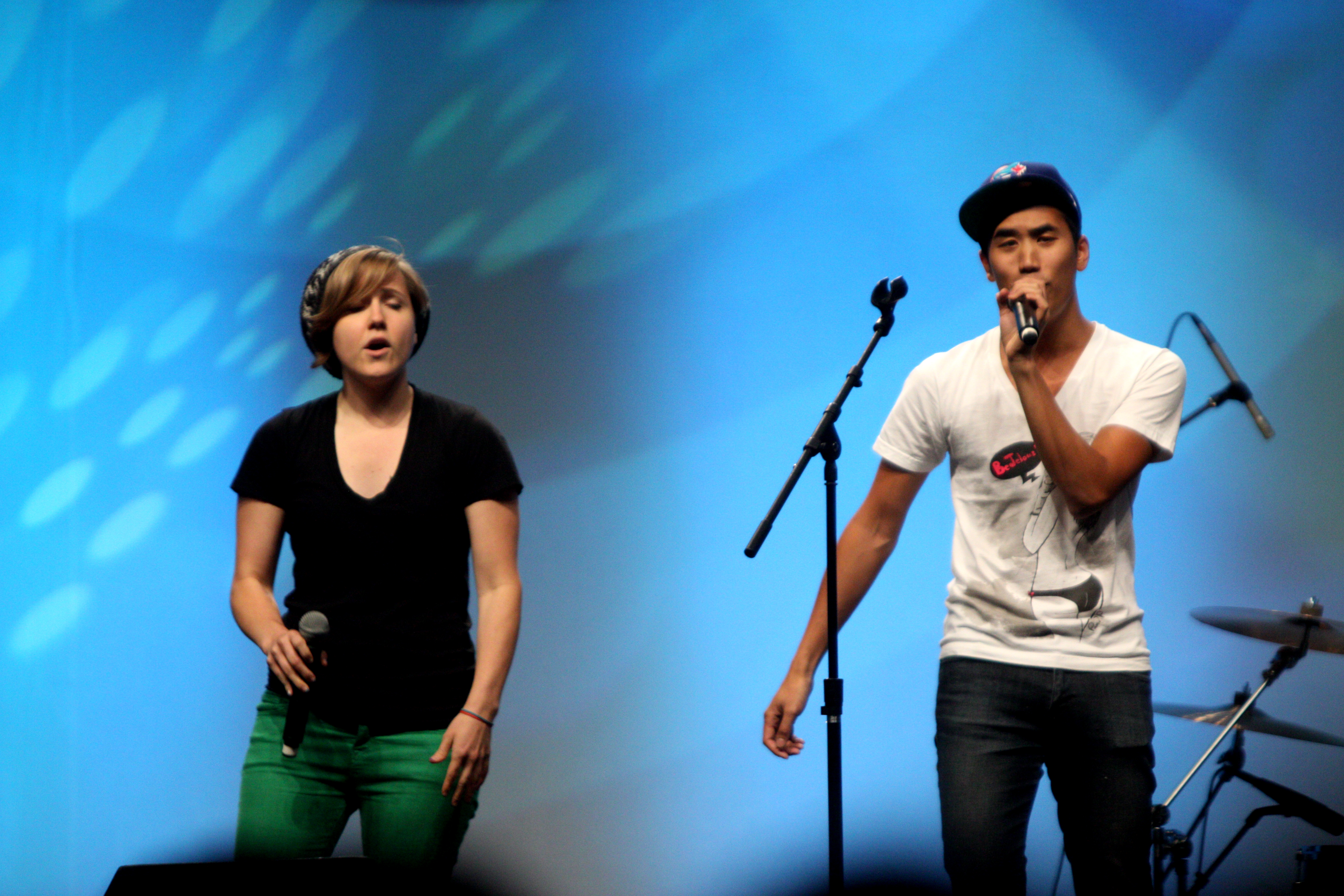
Huang and Hannah Hart performing at VidCon 2012

Huang has collaborated with various other YouTube personalities, notably with Boyinaband and Hannah Hart. He provided instrumentation and songwriting for Hank Green and the Perfect Strangers' Incongruent, and toured across the United States with the band. Huang produced the music for Rhett and Link's "Geeks vs. Nerds" music video in 2013.

In 2010, Huang teamed up with musician and internet personality Gunnarolla to produce videos and music, including the popular series We Are What You Tweet and New State Plates. The pair have toured North America, Australia, and New Zealand together. Huang and Gunnarolla later created electropop music duo Dreamz. As a duo, they entered CBC Music's Searchlight contest under this new name, and their debut single "Come On" was selected as CBC Here and Now's Song of the Week on March 11, 2013. Dreamz reached the Top 16 of the contest representing Toronto.

In 2008, Huang entered a contest run by American Express and won a chance to develop a music project with Emily Haines, lead vocalist for Canadian indie band Metric. He created an interactive installation featuring a series of videos that visitors could use to create ambient music. The piece was exhibited at the Four Seasons Centre in Toronto during November 2011.

Huang composed the anthem for WWF-Canada's official Earth Hour in 2012 using lyrics from user-submitted suggestions, taking the title of "Canada's first official crowd sourced song". Huang later performed the song live during Toronto's 2012 and 2013 Earth Day celebrations.

In late 2018, Huang formed a duo with Rob Scallon called First of October, where Huang and Scallon write and record an entire 10-track album in one recording session. The group has made seven albums, Ten Hours, Gourmet Ravioli, Gotta Record Everything Good, Chaos, Across the Road, Round 6, and One Week, all written and recorded in a day each.

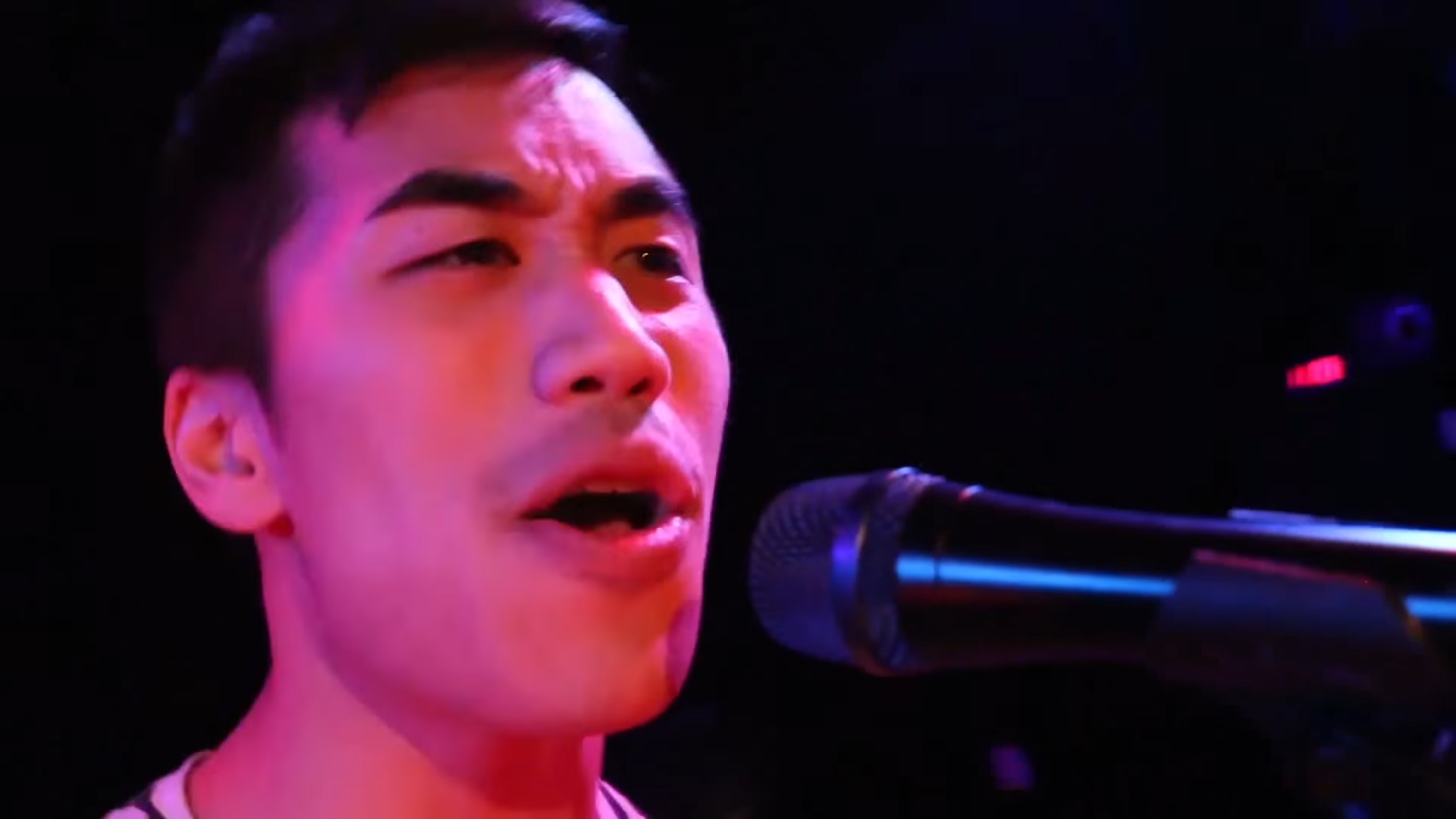
Huang performing with Hank Green and the Perfect Strangers in 2016

In June 2019, Andrew began a new project with YouTuber and science educator Hank Green, Journey to the Microcosmos, a YouTube channel uploading short videos of microscope slides accompanied by voiceovers explaining different mechanisms of microscopic biological life. Huang produces all of the ambient tracks for the show's background music.

On September 25, 2020, Huang was featured on track 8, "Top Secret", on funk-rock band TWRP's album Over The Top.

In April 2023, Huang launched a new project with YouTuber and musician Rob Scallon called Sonic Boom, a YouTube music show where the pair take on a variety of musical challenges often utilizing unusual instruments, time limits for creating full songs, and other factors. Huang and Scallon often release music from the show under the band name Sonic Boom. Sonic Boom was announced as ending in April 2025.

In April 2024, Huang collaborated with Blue Man Group to write an original song and appear in their music video for “Desert Portal.” The song was released on streaming services on April 20, 2024.

== Business ventures ==
=== Education ===
In 2019, Huang partnered with Studio (formerly Monthly) to create a 30-day music production course called Complete Music Production. He launched his music production courses in 2020.

=== Music production and equipment ===
In December 2020, Huang released Flip Sampler, a sample-based mobile music production app for iOS that allows users to create music using sounds recorded on their device as well as imported audio files. The app was conceptualized by Huang and developed by Oliver Greschke and Christian Blomert.

In October 2022, Huang collaborated with Endorphin.es to release a multi-FX Eurorack module called GHOST. In October 2023, Huang and Endorphin.es iterated on GHOST to release a guitar pedal version.

In August 2023, Huang collaborated with Baby Audio to release Transit for DAWs and iOS, a plugin designed to simplify and automate song transitions. It is available for DAWs and iOS. An updated version, Transit 2, was released in October 2024. Both plugins were jointly awarded the SOS Award for "Best Software Plug-in" by Sound on Sound in February 2025.

=== Authorship ===
In February 2024, Huang released his first book Make Your Own Rules detailing his background as a musician and his approaches to making music and the business of music, published by Simon & Schuster. The book became a USA Today bestseller the same month.

== Discography ==
List adapted from Spotify on June 17, 2025.

=== Studio albums ===
- Summer (Vol. 1/4) (2009)
- Autumn (Vol. 2/4) (2010)
- Hearing a Truth Serum (2011)
- Love Songs (2011)
- Schism (2011)
- Love & Desolation (2012)
- Droop (2012)
- You Are The Devil (2012)
- Magical Body (2013)
- Voyager (2013)
- Lip Bomb (2013)
- The Coldest Darkness (2013)
- Winter (Vol. 3/4) (2014)
- Spring (Vol. 4/4) (2014)
- Galaxy (2014)
- Comet (2014)
- Interplanetary (2015)
- Bouncy Castle (2015)
- Cosmos (2015)
- Pintxos (2015)
- Interstellar (2016)
- Lo-fi (2017)
- Stars (2017)
- FX (2018)
- TV & Video Games (2018)
- Synth City (2019)
- Alabaster (2019)
- Ganglia (2020)
- Ooo (2020)
- Spacetime (2021)
- Dust & Dewdrops (2022)

=== Compilation albums ===
- Internet (2014)

=== Collaboration albums ===
- Ten Hours (as First of October with Rob Scallon) (2018)
- Gourmet Ravioli (as First of October with Rob Scallon) (2019)
- Gotta Record Everything Good (as First of October with Rob Scallon) (2021)
- CHAOS (as First of October with Rob Scallon) (2022)
- Across The Road (as First of October with Rob Scallon) (2023)
- Oblivion (Remixes) (with various artists) (2024)
- Labyrinth (with Undulae) (2024)
- Round 6 (as First of October with Rob Scallon) (2024)
- Sonic Boom (with Sonic Boom) (2025)
- One Week (as First of October with Rob Scallon) (2025)
- A Future Without You (as First of October with Rob Scallon) (2026)
