= Gunnarolla =

Canadian musician (born 1986)

- Born: Andrew Gunadie; February 7, 1986 (age 40); London, Ontario, Canada
- Education: University of Western Ontario (BA (Hons)); Fanshawe College
- Occupations: Internet personality; video producer; musician; teacher; comedian
- Years active: 2006–present

YouTube information
- Channel: gunnarolla
- Years active: 2006–present
- Genre: Comedy
- Subscribers: 103 thousand
- Views: 19.8 million
- Last updated: 9 November 2025
- Website: www.gunnarolla.com

Andrew Gunadie (better known as gunnarolla on YouTube; born February 7, 1986) is a Canadian internet personality, musician, and video producer. He is best known for "Canadian, Please", a music video in which he co-starred and co-produced with Julia Bentley. Collectively, his YouTube videos have surpassed 19 million views. In 2013, he won the Digi Award for Online Personality of the Year.

== Early life and career ==
Gunadie was born on February 7 and raised in London, Ontario. He obtained a BA (Honours) in Media, Information & Technoculture at Western University, and a diploma in Television Broadcasting at Fanshawe College.

Gunadie has worked in post-production on several Canadian television productions, and he was also the Senior Coordinator, Multimedia Content for TIFF.

== "Canadian, Please" and issues of racism ==
Gunadie gained popularity on YouTube with the release of "Canadian, Please", a song and music video that he co-produced with Julia Bentley, and released just before Canada Day in 2009.

In the video, the pair sing about all the reasons why one would want to be Canadian, while wearing traditional RCMP jackets. The video went viral soon after its release, and has surpassed 5 million views. On December 20, 2009, Gunadie and Bentley performed the song live at the Olympic Torch Relay in Niagara Falls, Ontario.

Gunadie received many racist comments and threats, due to the fact that he is of visibly Asian descent. Many viewers felt that he was not an adequate representative of Canada, despite the fact that he was born, raised, and continues to live therein.

As a response to the criticism, Gunadie produced a video entitled "He'll Never Be a Real Canadian". Issues of race and stereotypes have since become a theme in Gunadie's work. His experience with racism was featured on a segment of "Online Uncovered" on CBC's Connect with Mark Kelley.

"Canadian, Please" was later featured in the YouTube video "Canadian Dances Moves" which also went viral.

== Team Andrew ==
Early in 2010, Gunadie teamed up with fellow musician and Internet personality Andrew Huang to produce videos and music, and series such as We Are What You Tweet and New State Plates. The pair have toured North America, Australia, and New Zealand together, and are commonly referred to as "Team Andrew".

=== "The Comic Sans Song" ===
While on tour in Australia, Gunadie began production on the music video for "The Comic Sans Song" which is part of Gunadie's #22songs series and features a rap by Huang. The majority of the video is set in Hosier Lane in Melbourne, Australia, and features Gunadie and a group of Australian fans.

The music video was released on May 22, 2012 and gained popularity thanks in part to being featured on BuzzFeed, Clients from Hell, MTV Buzzworthy Blog, Mashable, and even Ban Comic Sans.

=== Dreamz ===
Early in 2013, Gunadie and Huang teamed up again to form an electro-pop music duo called Dreamz. They entered CBC Music's Searchlight contest under this new name. Their debut single "Come On" was selected as CBC Here and Now's Song of the Week on March 11, 2013, and was played on CBC Radio One all that week.

They made it as far as the Top 16 of CBC Music's Searchlight contest, representing Toronto.

== Like/Comment/Subscribe live show ==
Outside of YouTube, Gunadie has teamed up with fellow YouTube personality Andrew Bravener to produce and host Like/Comment/Subscribe; a live, interactive show that features screenings and performances. According to Gunadie, the goal of the show "wasn’t to make the big videos bigger. We went into the community to find those hidden gems: rants, confessions, re-cuts, mashups, lip-syncs & even that ‘weird’ part of YouTube."

They premiered the show on Saturday, September 29, 2012 from 7pm to 7am at TIFF Bell Lightbox during Scotiabank Nuit Blanche 2012. Their hashtag #YTTO trended on Twitter that night. They later presented the show at PHI Centre on Saturday, March 2, 2013 for Montréal en lumière 2013 and presented a special edition of the show at the 2013 North by Northeast festival in Toronto.

Gunadie and Bravener also hosted the 2012 Digi Awards alongside French-Canadian host and producer Anne-Marie Withenshaw, and YouTube personality Harley Morenstein (of Epic Meal Time).

Along with Andrew Bravener, he presented "Cringeworthy!", a variation of the "Like/Comment/Subscribe" show, at Scotiabank Nuit Blanche 2014.

== Late 2013-present ==
Gunadie hosted various screenings and made appearances at Buffer Festival in Toronto.

He also served as YouTube correspondent for CBC's Searchlight competition, wherein he hosted a series called "Searchlight Spotlight".

In March 2014, his EP titled "S*X" peaked at #1 on the comedy chart of iTunes Canada.

== Discography ==
Year	Album Information	Track listing
2012	#22songs: Released: January 22, 2012	Track listing: 1. 22songs Intro/HEYx18 - Do You Like Pie?; 2. Party-Time YouTuber; 3. Cray Cray Is Dead (feat. Songs To Wear Pants To); 4. Sense No Make English; 5. Mailbox!; 6. Unicorn Lederhosen Mashup Moshup; 7. Teabaggin'; 8. Don't Worry; 9. Song Nein; 10. The Button-Maker Naomi Theme Song; 11. Get Some Food (feat. Songs To Wear Pants To); 12. The Chicken Told Me I Was Gay; 13. What If I Was a Llama?; 14. She's Just So GIFable; 15. Fake Glasses; 16. Stick It In Banana (co-produced & feat. jwktje); 17. The Comic Sans Song (feat. Songs To Wear Pants To); 18. I Love Sushi! - Let's Get Fish-Faced (feat. Ciaela); 19. Silent Letters; 20. Monster; 21. Substitute; 22. Told Me (feat. Rob Scallon); 23. #22 Songs Megamix (bonus track)
2013	As Heard On YouTube Vol 1: Released: June 2, 2013	Track listing: 1. The Comic Sans Song (Jwktje Remix); 2. The Foreign Language Song (extended version); 3. IDGAF; 4. Granola; 5. Take a Look at My Card; 6. Wine, Wine, All the Time; 7. Message en français 8. The ddonq Song; 9. Chocolate Pie; 10. Cray Cray (Gunnarollaw #26); 11. We On The Great Wall of China; 12. Sharla; 13. Tonzone; 14. The Hater Comment Song (uncensored version); 15. The Chicken Told Me I Was Gay (literal version); 16. Long Weekend/Musical; 17. Washing Dishes; 18. I Got a Tumblr; 19. Sexy Walk; 20. The Moment of Realiz-Asian; 21. Made for Study English! (extended version); 22. Sense No Make English (Good Grammar Remix)
2014	S*X: Released: March 24, 2014	Track listing: 1. Girl; 2. My D*ck; 3. Six Inches (feat. Ally Rhodes & Rob Scallon); 4. Turn U On; 5. Pat Dat Pussy (feat. Meghan Tonjes); 6. S My D (feat. Shannon Coffey)
2014	As Heard On YouTube Vol 2: Released: December 9, 2014	Track listing: 1. Staying In Tonight (feat. Andrew Hunt); 2. Won't Say It Twice; 3. The Ballad of Rob Ford; 4. 5 Songs To End Any Argument; 5. I Really Miss Your Face; 6. What Would Hank Green Do?; 7. I Won't Treat You Like...; 8. Big Box From Japan; 9. No No No; 10. Yeah Yeah Yeah (feat. Brad Go); 11. Jordan; 12. Circle Foods; 13. Triangle Foods; 14. Square Foods; 15. Avocado (feat. Meher Pavri); 16. If It's Not Organic; 17. Dreaming of Cake; 18. Nachos; 19. The Key Ingredient; 20. Videoblog: Latin Romance; 21. Videoblog: Quirky; 22. Goodbye, Shibuya (from TOKYO SEOUL); 23. No Regrets
2015	Magical Girl: Released: December 8, 2015	Track listing: 1. Magic; 2. Promise; 3. Guardian; 4. Big City; 5. Golden; 6. She Doesn't Know; 7. Starfield; 8. My Only Love (from 'Sailor Moon'); 9. See You Again; 10. Magical Boy
