= DFTBA Records =

Independent online merchandise company

- Founded: 2008
- Founders: Hank Green; Alan Lastufka
- Headquarters: Missoula, Montana (since 2013)
- Key people: John Green (co-owner); Laura Jones Joukovski (CEO)
- Number of employees: About 50 (2022)
- Website: dftba.com

DFTBA Records, LLC, commonly known as DFTBA.com, is an e-commerce merchandise company that was co-founded by Hank Green and Alan Lastufka in 2008. Originally a record label, the company focuses on selling merchandise for prominent YouTube content creators including Green, his brother the novelist John Green, Charlotte McDonnell, CGP Grey, Kurzgesagt, and Charles Trippy among several others. DFTBA is an initialism for "don't forget to be awesome", a catchphrase of the Green brothers.

== Background ==
The name of the company originates from the initialism "Don't Forget to Be Awesome". The name is generally seen as the motto for the VlogBrothers (consisting of Hank and John Green), as well as their fan base, known as Nerdfighteria. The original goal of the record label, as Lastufka said in a video is to provide a distribution network for talented artists of YouTube and to make sure their music reaches out to the "largest audience possible."

== History ==
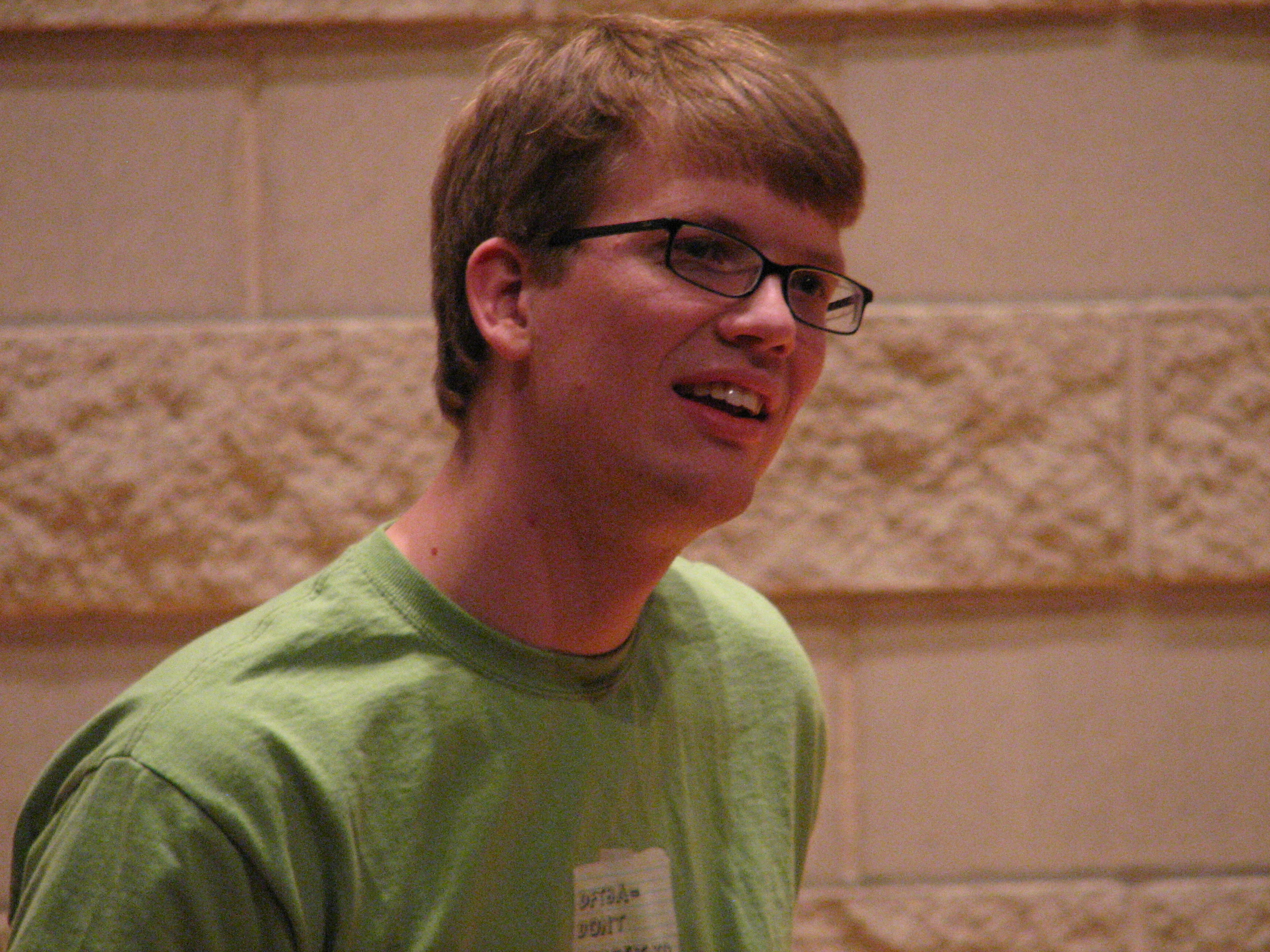
Hank Green at an event in St. Paul, Minnesota in 2008, the year he co-founded DFTBA Records

The offices of DFTBA Records were in Manhattan, Illinois in Lastufka's home, until early 2013 when they moved to Missoula, Montana where Green lives. After moving to Missoula, they set up their warehouse in a small building which was formerly a preschool, but soon moved to a larger warehouse. They increased their number of employees from five to ten and started another webseries called The Warehouse, hosted by warehouse manager Matthew Gaydos. The channel no longer uploads content as Matthew Gaydos works on other YouTube channels. Distribution of records by DFTBA Records is largely independent. Lastufka handled most of the distribution during his tenure as co-owner. On June 18, 2014, he announced his decision to sell his stake in the record label and resigned as president, to pursue other projects. In April 2015, DFTBA Records received a business license in Missoula.

In March 2014, several artists signed under DFTBA Records including Alex Day and Tom Milsom, were involved in sexual abuse accusations. After that all artists which had been accused of having sexual encounters with their fans or of being perpetrators of sexual abuse were dropped from the label. Lastufka made a $1000 donation to the Rape, Abuse & Incest National Network. Both Hank and John Green made public announcements on YouTube and Tumblr regarding the situation. Around the same time, a former DFTBA Record-signed artist, Mike Lombardo was sentenced to five years in prison and pleaded guilty on eleven counts of child pornography charges. Lombardo's ex-girlfriend, Hayley G. Hoover, who is also signed under DFTBA Records, spoke out against him.

== Merchandise ==
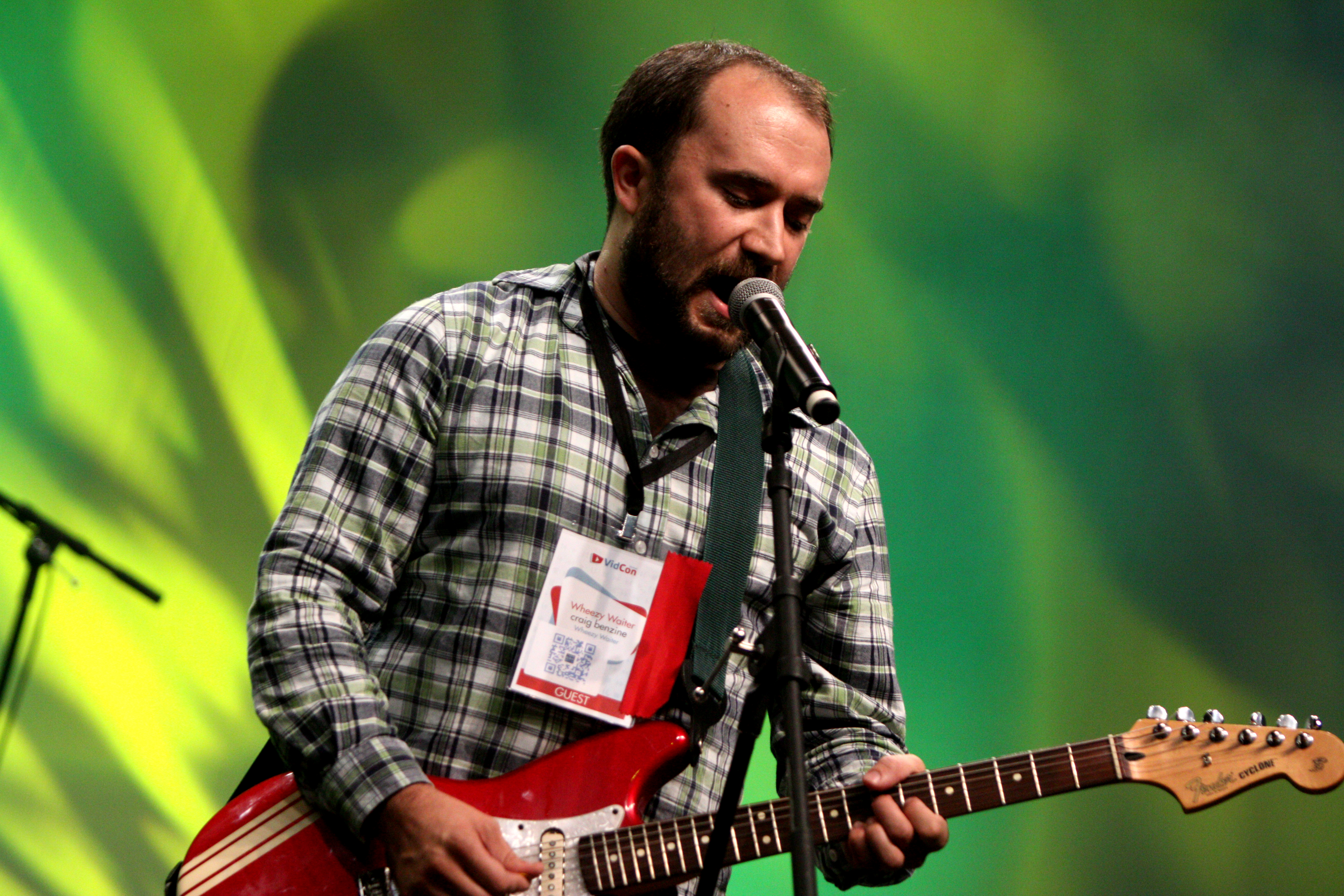
Craig Benzine (WheezyWaiter) at VidCon 2012

DFTBA Records was originally founded as a music record label. However the company primarily sells merchandise, ranging from T-shirts to buttons. Artists signed to DFTBA Records are not exclusively musical artists. For example, official The Fault in Our Stars merchandise was sold on the website including a limited-edition box set with an audiobook version of the novel. Additionally, the artists responsible for the designs on merchandise, such as apparel or accessories receive royalties for their contributions.

Artists signed under the label have been successful and there has been unforeseen career growth due to signing with the label, such as Craig Benzine and his band, Driftless Pony Club. In 2009, Lastufka said "A lot of [our artists] are very nichey." Within two years, the record label had over $1 million in sales including music and merchandise.
