= SciShow =

Science-related YouTube channel

- Genre: Education
- Created by: Hank Green
- Presented by: Hank Green; Michael Aranda; Stefan Chin; Reid Reimers
- Country of origin: United States
- Original language: English

Production
- Production location: Missoula, Montana
- Production company: Complexly

Original release
- Release: January 2, 2012 – present

SciShow is a collection of YouTube channels that focuses on science news. The program is hosted by Hank Green along with a rotating cast of co-hosts. SciShow was launched as an original channel. The series has been consistently releasing new material since it was created in 2012.

Since its launch, three additional channels have been launched under the SciShow brand: SciShow Space, SciShow Psych, and SciShow Kids.

== History and funding ==
The channel was launched as an "original channel", which meant that YouTube funded the channel. The show's initial grant was projected to expire in 2014, and in response, on September 12, 2013, SciShow joined the viewer-funding site Subbable, created in part by Green.

In 2014, the channel landed a national advertisement deal with YouTube. The educational program was featured on platforms such as billboards and television commercials as a result. Green details that the advertisements had a positive effect on SciShow, stating, "My Twitter exploded, our followers and subscribers exploded."

After Patreon acquired Subbable, the channel switched over to Patreon, where it continued to receive support in exchange for various perks. As of March 2017, SciShow had over 4,000 patrons.

== Production and hosting ==
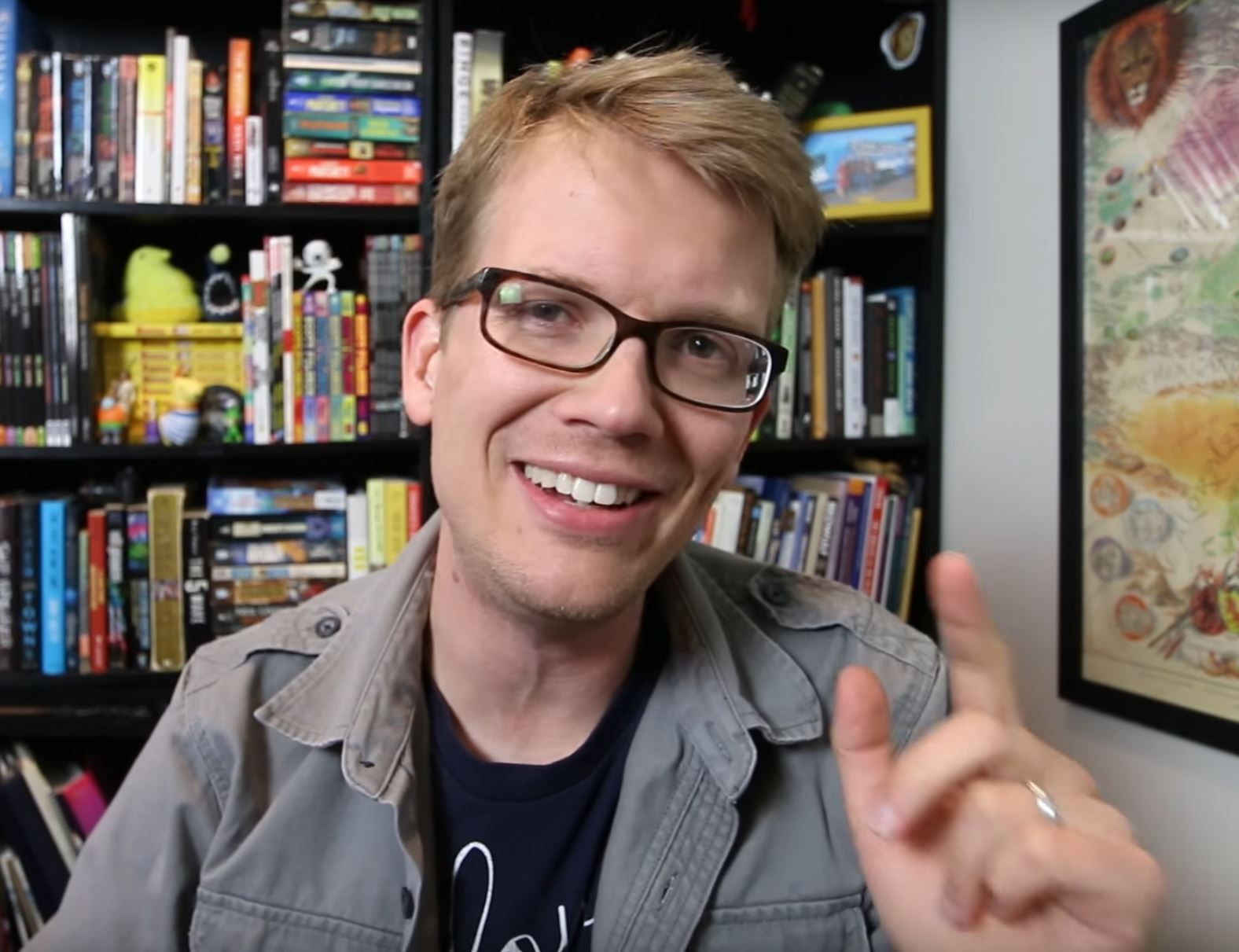
Hank Green, host of SciShow

Though Green hosts the majority of episodes, the show has alternate hosts; Michael Aranda has been with the show since its inception, and Olivia Gordon of the Missoula Insectarium joined in June 2016. Gordon left SciShow in August 2020, and was replaced by ethnobotanist Rose Bear Don't Walk. Prior to her move to Chicago, Emily Graslie of The Brain Scoop also occasionally hosted on the channel. There have also been guest appearances by Lindsey Doe, who hosts Sexplanations, another channel launched by Green; and by longtime SciShow staffer Stefan Chin, who since 2017 has been a regular host. SciShow has grown since its 2012 launch; it now employs a full editorial, production, and operations staff.

SciShow Space had three rotating hosts: Hank Green, Reid Reimers, and Caitlin Hofmeister. Similarly, SciShow Psych rotated hosting between Hank Green, Brit Garner, and Anthony Brown. SciShow Kids is primarily hosted by Jessi Knudsen Castañeda, host of Animal Wonders Montana.

== Content ==
Several different scientific fields are covered by SciShow, including chemistry, physics, biology, zoology, geology, geography, entomology, botany, meteorology, astronomy, medicine, psychology, anthropology, math and computer science. The videos on SciShow have a vast variety of different topics, such as nutrition, and "science superlatives". As of April 2020, SciShow has released over 2250 videos.

A spin-off channel, SciShow Space, launched in April 2014 to specialize in space topics. Space stopped posting new content in January 2023, directing new space content to the main SciShow channel. A second spin-off, SciShow Kids, launched in March 2015 to specialize in delivering science topics to children. Kids went on hiatus in late 2018, returning in April 2020. A third spinoff channel was announced in February 2017, SciShow Psych, which debuted in March 2017, specializing in psychology and neuroscience. Psych went on permanent hiatus in 2022. A podcast, SciShow Tangents, was launched in November 2018; it features entertaining exchanges of scientific facts among many of the shows' staffers, and is directed at a mature audience.

== Podcast ==
In November 2018, a co-branded podcast titled SciShow Tangents was launched as a co-production with WNYC Studios. It consisted of a panel format where Hank Green, Ceri Riley, Stefan Chin, and Sam Schultz share facts about science on a weekly theme; each episode has multiple segments, several of which are competitive. In late 2020, the podcast ceased its association with WNYC Studios, and continued for more than four years as an independently produced entity. The podcast wrapped up on March 18, 2025, with the release of its 251st episode.

SciShow Tangents was a restructured and reimagined continuation of the hosts previous podcast, Holy Fucking Science, which ran from January 2017 to March 2018.

== Reception ==
As SciShow has amassed a large following, the channel has been featured on several media outlets.

In October 2014, the channel surpassed two million subscribers and over 210 million video views. As of July 2025, the channel has over 8 million subscribers and over 2.1 billion total views.

In 2017, SciShow won a Webby Award in the People's Voice category.
