= Complexly =

American online video production company

- Formerly: EcoGeek LLC
- Type: Non-profit 501(c)(3)
- Industry: Video and audio production
- Genre: Educational entertainment
- Founded: 2012; 14 years ago
- Founder: Hank Green and John Green
- Headquarters: Missoula, Montana; Indianapolis, Indiana
- Key people: Julie Walsh Smith (CEO); John Green (Founder Emeritus); Hank Green (Director)
- Brands: Crash Course; SciShow; Dear Hank & John; The Anthropocene Reviewed; The Art Assignment; Eons; Healthcare Triage; Journey to the Microcosmos; Ours Poetica
- Number of employees: Over 70 (2024)
- Website: complexly.org

Complexly, Inc. is an online educational audio and video production studio, headquartered in Missoula, Montana. In February 2026, Complexly founders John and Hank Green donated their equity to restructure the company as a 501(c)(3) nonprofit, focusing on the production of free, accessible, and fact-based educational videos. Complexly produces educational videos distributed through their YouTube channels including Crash Course, SciShow, and more.

Originally named EcoGeek LLC, it was founded by Hank Green to support his blog on environmental and science issues and was renamed in 2016. The company's strengths in educational content has led to production funding from Google, PBS, and the Poetry Foundation, among other corporations and charitable foundations.

Julie Walsh Smith became acting CEO of the company in September 2023, and the Green brothers are now listed as founders on the company's website; Smith was later named as permanent CEO.

Early 2024 saw Complexly venture into their first esports sponsorship, signing Blue Scuti, who had just gone viral as "the boy who beat Tetris".

== Video productions ==
=== Crash Course ===
Multiple hosts and courses; see main article

Crash Course is an educational YouTube channel providing many courses of study, often based around the AP curriculum of a given subject. The level of study matches that of high school or early college, but the content is available for all ages. Many courses are co-produced with PBS Digital Studios. The channel launched in 2012, with two subjects, World History and Biology, being taught by John Green and Hank Green, respectively.

=== SciShow ===
Multiple hosts and channels; see main article

SciShow is a series of science-related videos, hosted primarily by Hank Green and Michael Aranda. Video topics include breaking scientific news, in-depth analyses of scientific concepts and science history, and science fact compilations. A spin-off channel, SciShow Space, launched in April 2014 to specialize in space exploration, astronomy, and cosmology. A second spin-off, SciShow Kids, launched in March 2015 to specialize in delivering science topics to children. Kids went on hiatus in late 2018, returning in April 2020. A third spinoff channel was announced in February 2017, SciShow Psych, which debuted in March 2017, specializing in psychology and neuroscience. A podcast, SciShow Tangents, was launched in November 2018; it features entertaining exchanges of scientific facts among many of the shows' staffers, and is directed at a mature audience.

=== SciShow Kids ===
Host: Jessi Knudsen Castañeda Co-host: Anthony Brown (since end of hiatus)

SciShow Kids is a YouTube channel dedicated to science news and topics of interest to grade-school-aged children. SciShow Kids went on hiatus from January 2019 to August 2020.

=== The Art Assignment ===
Host: Sarah Urist Green

The Art Assignment is a PBS Digital Studios co-production focused on contemporary art. Initially oriented around 'assignments' given by noted artists to the audience to complete, it has gradually shifted its emphasis to discuss contemporary art in a broader sense. In 2020, host Sarah Urist Green published a book, You Are an Artist, based on the art assignment concept.

=== Healthcare Triage ===
Host: Aaron Carroll

Healthcare Triage is a series about modern healthcare that discusses healthcare policy and medical research, and answers questions about medicine, health, and healthcare.

=== PBS Eons ===
Hosts: Blake de Pastino, Kallie Moore, Michelle Barboza-Ramirez (since 2021), Gabriel-Philip Santos; formerly Hank Green

Eons is a PBS Digital Studios co-production and is a channel about the evolutionary history of life on Earth.

=== Journey to the Microcosmos ===
Hosts: Hank Green, Deboki Chakravarti (since 2021)

Journey to the Microcosmos presents the living collections of microbiologist James Weiss to give a close-up look of microscopic life. Music by Andrew Huang, narrated by Hank Green.

=== Ours Poetica ===
Host: Various

Ours Poetica captures the intimate experience of holding a poem in your hands and listening as it is read by a distinctive voice. A co-production with The Poetry Foundation, and poet Paige Lewis.

=== Bizarre Beasts ===
Host: Hank Green, Sarah Suta

Bizarre Beasts spun off from a monthly Vlogbrothers segment hosted by Hank Green centred on animal species displaying unusual anatomy or behaviour. After a one-year pilot, it was made into its own monthly series on the Bizarre Beasts YouTube channel. Subscribers to the Bizarre Beasts Pin Club receive a pin of each animal featured.

=== Complexly ===
Host: various

Complexly launched a self-named channel in May 2018, to share themed playlists, post one-off videos and miniseries, and pilot new channels. Its first regular series, Ask Hank Anything, debuted in January 2025; it was joined by The History Show, hosted by RJ McLaughlin, that September.

== Audio productions ==
In November 2018, Complexly fully launched a co-production arrangement with WNYC Studios for three regular podcasts; two had been produced independently before, one was new (but adapted from an old format). Two years later the co-production was ended, and Complexly now produces the shows on its own.

=== Dear Hank & John ===
Hosts: Hank Green and John Green

Originally launched in 2015, this weekly podcast features Hank and John Green answering questions e-mailed by listeners, giving "dubious" advice and providing weekly news for the planet Mars and the 3rd-tier English football club AFC Wimbledon.

=== Eons: Deep Time ===
Host: Kallie Moore, Blake de Pastino, Michelle Barboza-Ramirez, Gabriel Santos

Launched in March 2022, Eons: Deep Time is adapted from the YouTube series PBS Eons. Its first season, Mysteries of Deep Time, explores some of the greatest mysteries in natural history. Its second season, Surviving Deep Time, offers hypothetical scenarios of its hosts being transported to seminal moments and locations in natural history and investigates how well they could survive there.

== Productions no longer affiliated with Complexly ==
=== The Brain Scoop ===
Host: Emily Graslie

The Brain Scoop was first created by Hank Green when he visited the zoological museum at the University of Montana and met one of its collections volunteers, Emily Graslie. Her on-camera presence was exceptional, and he launched a channel soon afterward based in that museum with Graslie as host, in January 2013. The channel enjoyed remarkable success and in a matter of months had caught the attention of staffers at the Field Museum in Chicago; Graslie and the program moved there in August 2013. After a period where the Field licensed the program from Green, they eventually purchased all its rights and trademarks; they produced the show in-house until 2020. Graslie recovered the rights under her personal ownership and revived the channel in 2024.

=== Mental Floss Video ===
Hosts: John Green, Elliott Morgan, others

Mental Floss is the video arm of Mental Floss, providing interesting facts centered on one particular subject matter. Complexly produced the channel's content from 2013 to 2018; from 2019 on, Mental Floss brought its production in-house.

=== The Financial Diet ===
Host: Chelsea Fagan

The Financial Diet is a personal finance advice channel, directed toward young adults and particularly young women.

=== Sexplanations ===
Host: Lindsey Doe

Sexplanations is a video series explaining sexual topics, hosted by clinical sexologist Dr. Lindsey Doe.

=== Animal Wonders ===
Host: Jessi Knudsen Castañeda

Animal Wonders is a video series from the namesake wildlife animal center outside of Missoula. It focuses on the center's 80+ exotic animals, including their care and habitat.

== Ceased productions ==
=== 100 Days ===
Hosts: John Green, Chris Waters

100 Days was a video series that acted as a personal initiative of John Green, exploring how to 'have a healthy midlife crisis'. He is joined in physical exercises and other feats by his best friend Chris. It ran through the early months of 2017.

=== The Anthropocene Reviewed ===
Host: John Green

A podcast originally launched in January 2018, each episode of The Anthropocene Reviewed features Green reviewing "facets of the human condition on a five-star scale". The name comes from the Anthropocene, the proposed epoch that includes significant human impact on the environment. Episodes typically contain Green reviewing two topics, accompanied by stories on how they have affected his life. The final episode was released in August 2021.

=== Crash Course Kids ===
Host: Sabrina Cruz

Crash Course Kids was a bi-weekly show from the producers of Crash Course about grade school science.

=== How to Adult ===
Hosts: Hank Green, Rachel Calderon Navarro

How to Adult was a general advice channel directed toward young adults entering the broader world of adulthood for the first time. The channel was originated in 2014 by T. Michael Martin and Emma Mills who hosted it until August 2016; Complexly revived it with their blessing in March 2017, and the channel aired its final episode in April 2018.

=== Holy Fucking Science ===
Host: various

Holy Fucking Science was a science-based entertainment show where four people (typically SciShow staffers, and guests) get together to try to astound and amaze each other with scientific facts and discoveries; it was directed at adults only. Though each episode was filmed and posted to YouTube, it was intended to be enjoyed as a podcast. Their regular sponsor was Montana brewery Big Sky Brewing Company. The show ceased in March 2018 after 58 episodes, with the promise of a similar production to soon replace it; SciShow Tangents took its place in November 2018.

=== Nature League ===
Host: Brit Garner

Nature League was an internet show exploring nature; each month had a new theme, and each week a different format.

=== The Origin of Everything ===
Host: Danielle Bainbridge

The Origin of Everything was a show about under-told history and culture that challenges our everyday assumptions. Having first launched as a PBS Digital Studios production in 2018, with its second season in 2019 it became a Complexly co-production; following its third season in 2020, PBS cancelled the show.

=== How to Vote in Every State ===
Host: Hank Green (2016, 2018, 2022), Nicole Sweeney (2020), Evelyn Ngugi (Voter Guide)

How to Vote in Every State was an initiative based around the 2016 United States elections to help voters determine how to properly register and submit their vote. Videos were posted for all 50 states and the District of Columbia, as well as for those in the military, overseas, and in unincorporated territories. The series was re-done two years later for the 2018 United States elections; a further version for the 2020 United States elections was also made, with the assistance of the Poynter Institute's MediaWise project, which also allowed them to augment the channel with an 8-episode Voter Guide series. Complexly chose not to renew the series for 2024, as resources from organizations such as Vote.org were considered to be suitable alternatives.

=== Crash Course Pods: The Universe ===
Crash Course Pods: The Universe was a podcast series spinoff of Crash Course with 11 episodes hosted by John Green and Katie Mack from April 23 to September 11, 2024.

=== SciShow Tangents ===
Panel: Hank Green, Sam Schultz, Ceri Riley; formerly Stefan Chin

Adapted from their previous show, Holy Fucking Science, Tangents is a weekly science-based show where SciShow staffers puzzle and entertain each other with fascinating facts. Starting from the May 17, 2022, episode, video recordings of each episode are also posted to YouTube. The show concluded in March 2025.
