= Sarah Urist Green =

American art curator and web series host (born 1979)

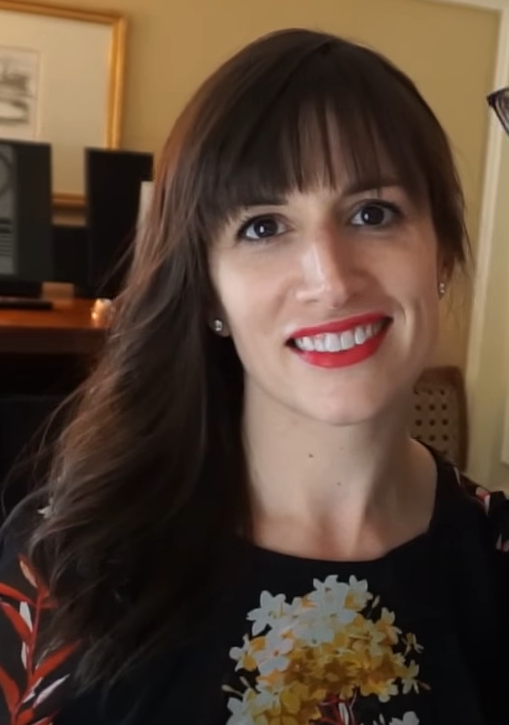
- Green in 2023
- Born: Sarah Urist; October 3, 1979 (age 46); Washington, D.C., U.S.
- Education: Northwestern University (BA); Columbia University (MA)
- Spouse: John Green (m. 2006)
- Children: 2
- Relatives: Hank Green (brother-in-law)
- Website: theartassignment.com

Sarah Urist Green (née Urist; born October 3, 1979) is an American art museum curator, author, and creator and host of PBS Digital Studios program The Art Assignment and Ours Poetica. Green spent seven years curating exhibitions at the Indianapolis Museum of Art, and has freelanced as a curator for other institutions. She now serves as the artistic director for Monumental Gestures, an Indianapolis-based art initiative. She is married to author John Green, who serves as an executive producer for The Art Assignment and Ours Poetica.

== Early life and education ==
Green is originally from Washington, D.C., and grew up in Birmingham, Alabama. She attended Indian Springs School outside of Birmingham at the same time as her future husband John Green, though they did not become friends until they became reacquainted in the early 2000s. She earned a bachelor's degree from Northwestern University. Green moved to the Upper West Side in New York City in 2005 with her then-fiancé John Green while she earned her master's degree in art history from Columbia University.

== Career ==
=== Indianapolis Museum of Art (2007–2013) ===
Starting in 2007, Green worked as a curator for the Indianapolis Museum of Art. While there, she curated the exhibitions "Andy Warhol Enterprises" and "Graphite", among others, and commissioned numerous works for the museum. Green curated the first full-scale retrospective of the work of Chinese activist and artist Ai Weiwei in the United States. She was also the co-developer of the museum's Virginia B. Fairbanks Art & Nature Park. Green left the museum in 2013, stating in an interview with NUVO, "I feel very comfortable saying that my vision doesn't align with (CEO Charles) Venable's. It's kind of a blessing in disguise for me because if I hadn't been compelled to leave there, I wouldn't be in the place I am right now."

=== The Art Assignment and other projects (2014–present) ===
On February 20, 2014, Green launched The Art Assignment, a PBS and Complexly video series in which artists encourage viewers to imitate their creative exercises. The series began with episodes that introduced viewers to practicing artists across the United States. After sharing background information about the artist and historical context for their work, Green invited the artists "assign" an art project to viewers following particular instructions. Follow-up "highlights" videos featuring examples of user-submitted work were also posted, and Gallery 924 in Indianapolis held an exhibit of The Art Assignment work in August 2016. As the series evolved, Green branched out into different formats for the channel, including a popular series on "Art Cooking," in which she recreates recipes from famous artists such as Frida Kahlo and Salvador Dalí. There are also videos that focus on "The Case For" or "Better Know" particular artists or pieces, such as Andy Warhol, in which Green brings her art critic skills to bear on explaining and analyzing well-known staples of the art world.

In 2015 and 2016, Green was a juror for the 3D category of the ArtPrize competition, as well as for ArtPrize's Pitch Night event.

In September 2019, Sarah, in collaboration with her husband John Green and the Poetry Foundation, launched the YouTube channel "Ours Poetica". The channel features videos of poets, celebrities, and others reading poems they like. Poet Paige Lewis acted as the curator of the channel for the first season and Kaveh Akbar also work on the channel. Featured readers have included Shailene Woodley, Ashley C. Ford, Emily Graslie, and Samin Nosrat, among others.

Green adapted the video assignments from The Art Assignment into a book, You Are an Artist: Assignments to Spark Creation, released on April 14, 2020. The book featured forty assignments adapted from the video series and thirteen newly commissioned prompts. Released during the beginning of the COVID-19 pandemic in the United States, Green hosted a series of virtual events instead of a traditional book tour. Later that year, she announced The Art Assignment YouTube channel would be going on an indefinite hiatus.

In late 2022, Green served on the curatorial team for the second "Butter" fine art fair hosted by Indianapolis cultural development firm Ganggang.

In March 2024, it was announced that Green would host an Art History series for the Crash Course YouTube channel; it launched on April 11.

In August 2024, the nonprofit Monumental Gestures was launched with Green serving as the artistic director. The organization's mission is to bring large scale art to Indianapolis by collaborating with institutions, city government, artists, and community members. The work is aimed to be on scale with St. Louis' Gateway Arch, Detroit's Joe Louis Fist and Alabama's National Memorial for Peace and Justice.

== Personal life ==
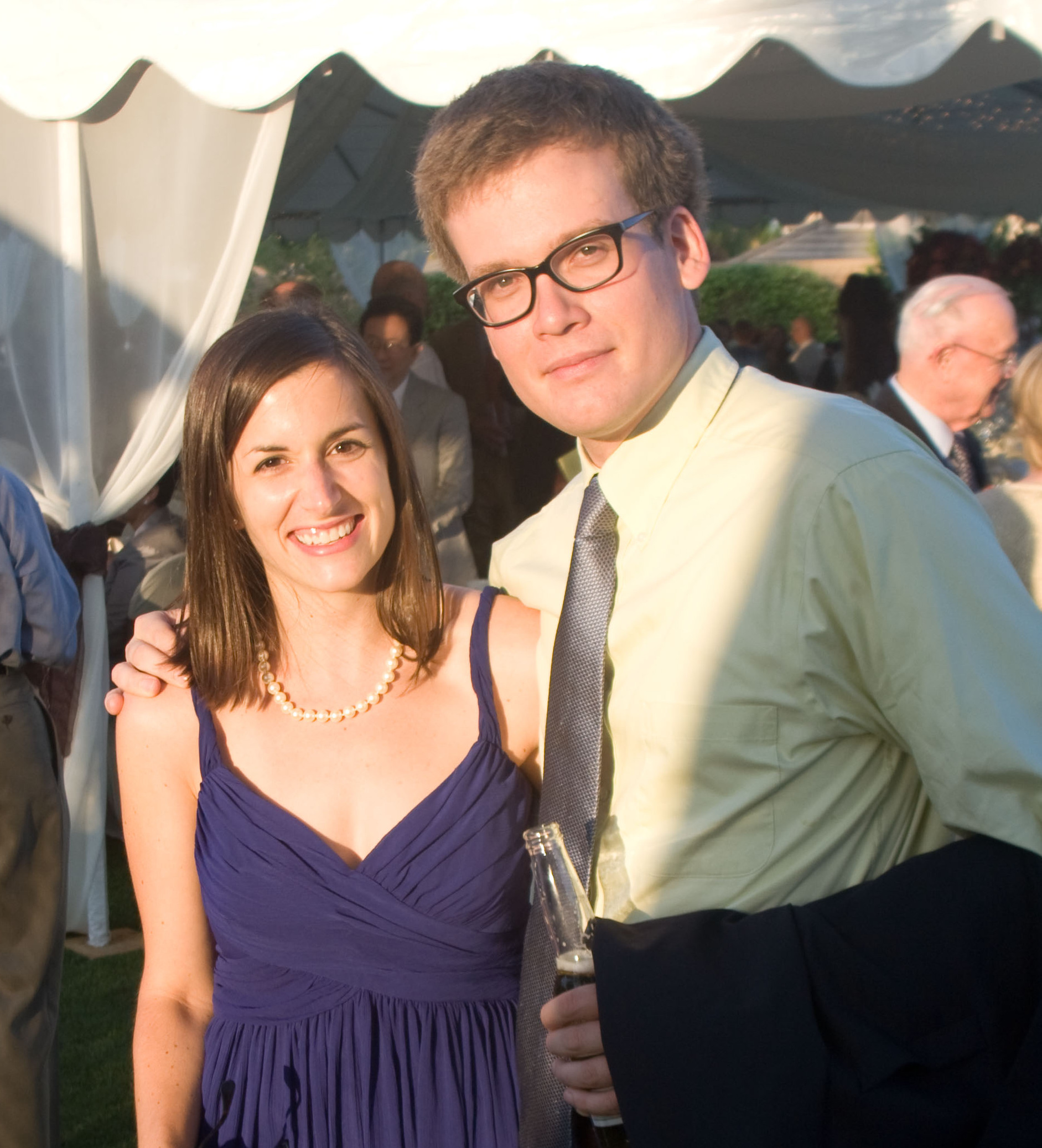
Sarah and John Green in 2008

Sarah met John Green when they both attended the same preparatory school in Indian Springs, Alabama. They became reacquainted eight years later in Chicago, when John began dating Sarah's boxing partner; after they broke up, John became friends with Sarah. Urist became engaged to Green on April 22, 2005, and the two married on May 21, 2006. They have two children.

In his early videos on the Vlogbrothers YouTube channel, John often referred to Sarah as "the yeti", because while she was talked about frequently in his videos, by her own request she did not appear on camera. As John's internet presence grew into a career and Sarah's own professional life developed, she grew more comfortable in front of the camera, stating in an interview in 2013, "I'm ready now to acknowledge now that I'm no longer really 'The Yeti', but I'm a full person."
