= Hank Green =

American vlogger, entrepreneur, and science communicator (born 1980)

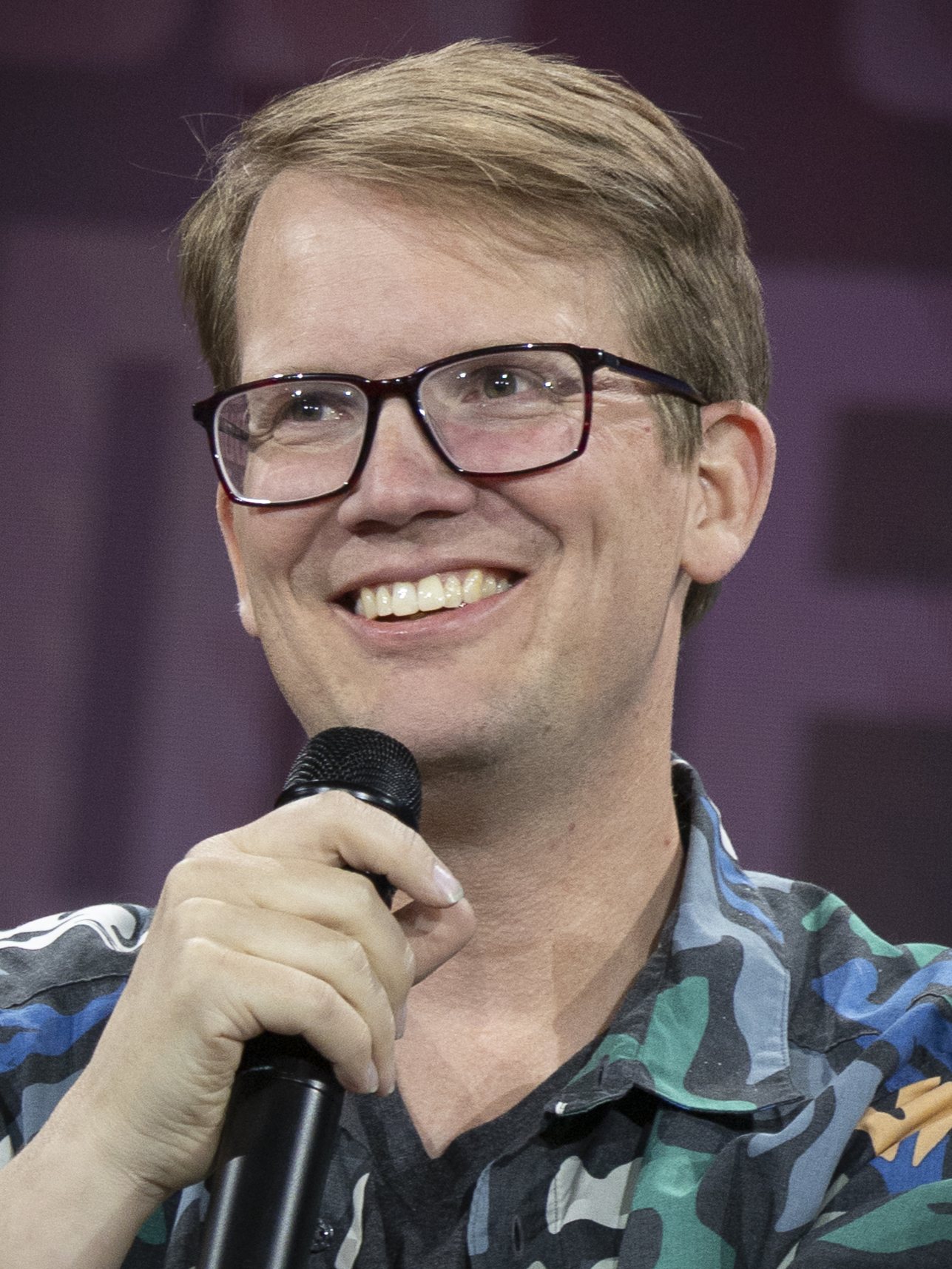
- Green in 2026
- Born: William Henry Green II; May 5, 1980 (age 46); Birmingham, Alabama, U.S.
- Education: Eckerd College (BS); University of Montana (MS)
- Occupations: YouTube vlogger; entrepreneur; podcaster; producer; TikToker; author; musician; comedian
- Years active: 2007–present
- Notable work: Vlogbrothers; Crash Course; SciShow; An Absolutely Remarkable Thing
- Spouse: Katherine Green (m. 2006)
- Children: 1
- Relatives: John Green (brother); Sarah Urist Green (sister-in-law)
- Website: hankgreen.com; hankandjohn.com

William Henry Green II (born May 5, 1980), known as Hank Green, is an American YouTuber, science communicator, novelist, stand-up comedian, and entrepreneur. He produces the YouTube channel Vlogbrothers with his older brother, author John Green, and hosts the educational YouTube channels Crash Course and SciShow. He has advocated for and organized social activism, created and hosted a number of other YouTube channels and podcasts, released music albums, and has over 8 million followers on TikTok.

Hank and his brother John co-created VidCon, the world's largest conference about online videos, and the Project for Awesome, an annual online charity event, as well as the now-defunct conference NerdCon: Stories, focused on storytelling. He is the co-creator of The Lizzie Bennet Diaries (2012–2013), an adaptation of Pride and Prejudice in the style of video blogs that was the first web series to win an Emmy. He is also the co-founder of merchandise company DFTBA Records, crowdfunding platform Subbable (acquired by Patreon), game company DFTBA Games, and online video production company Pemberley Digital, which produces video blog adaptations of classic novels in the public domain. Green is the founder of the environmental technology blog EcoGeek, which evolved into Complexly, an online video and audio production company of which he was the CEO until late 2023. Green also hosts the podcasts Dear Hank & John and Delete This with his brother and wife respectively, along with the podcast SciShow Tangents.

Green's debut novel, An Absolutely Remarkable Thing, was published on September 25, 2018; its sequel A Beautifully Foolish Endeavor was published on July 7, 2020. Both novels debuted as New York Times Best Sellers. In response to being diagnosed and treated for Hodgkin lymphoma in 2023, Green stepped down as CEO of his companies. While recovering, Green began performing stand-up about his experience. His comedy special titled Pissing Out Cancer was released on the streaming service Dropout on June 21, 2024. In July 2025, Green partnered with Honey B Games to launch Focus Friend, a productivity app which allows users to set a timer that temporarily blocks other apps. The app reached number one on Apple's App Store charts for free apps.

== Early life and career ==
William Henry Green II was born on May 5, 1980, to Mike and Sydney Green in Birmingham, Alabama, but his family soon moved to Orlando, Florida, where he was raised. Green is of Irish ancestry. He graduated from Winter Park High School in 1998. He then earned a B.S. in biochemistry from Eckerd College in 2002 and a M.S. in environmental studies from the University of Montana. His master's thesis was titled "Of Both Worlds: How the Personal Computer and the Environmental Movement Change Everything".

Throughout high school and college, Green created and designed websites for himself and local clients. His first project, the "Mars Exploration Page", in 1994, experienced minor success on the heels of the Mars Pathfinder Mission. A later website, IHateI4.com, which was about Green's dislike for Interstate 4, a widely unpopular highway among Floridians, brought press from local news channels and the Orlando Sentinel. Green continued as a web developer after moving to Montana for graduate school, focusing on developing websites for educational institutions (including the University of Montana) and environmental nonprofit organizations.

While in graduate school, Green created "EcoGeek", a blog focusing on technological advancements that benefit the environment. Starting as a class project, EcoGeek evolved into a major environmental publication. It caught the attention of Time, where it was described as "porn for hardcore science, tech and enviro freaks". Writing about environmental issues, Green has been published on numerous environmental blogs, including Treehugger.com, Yahoo! Green, The National Geographic Green Guide, Scientific American, The Weather Channel, Planet Green, NPR, and in The New York Times. During the mid-2000s, Green wrote regularly for Mental Floss and co-authored one of their books, Mental Floss: Scatterbrained.

== YouTube channels ==
=== As a host ===
==== Vlogbrothers ====
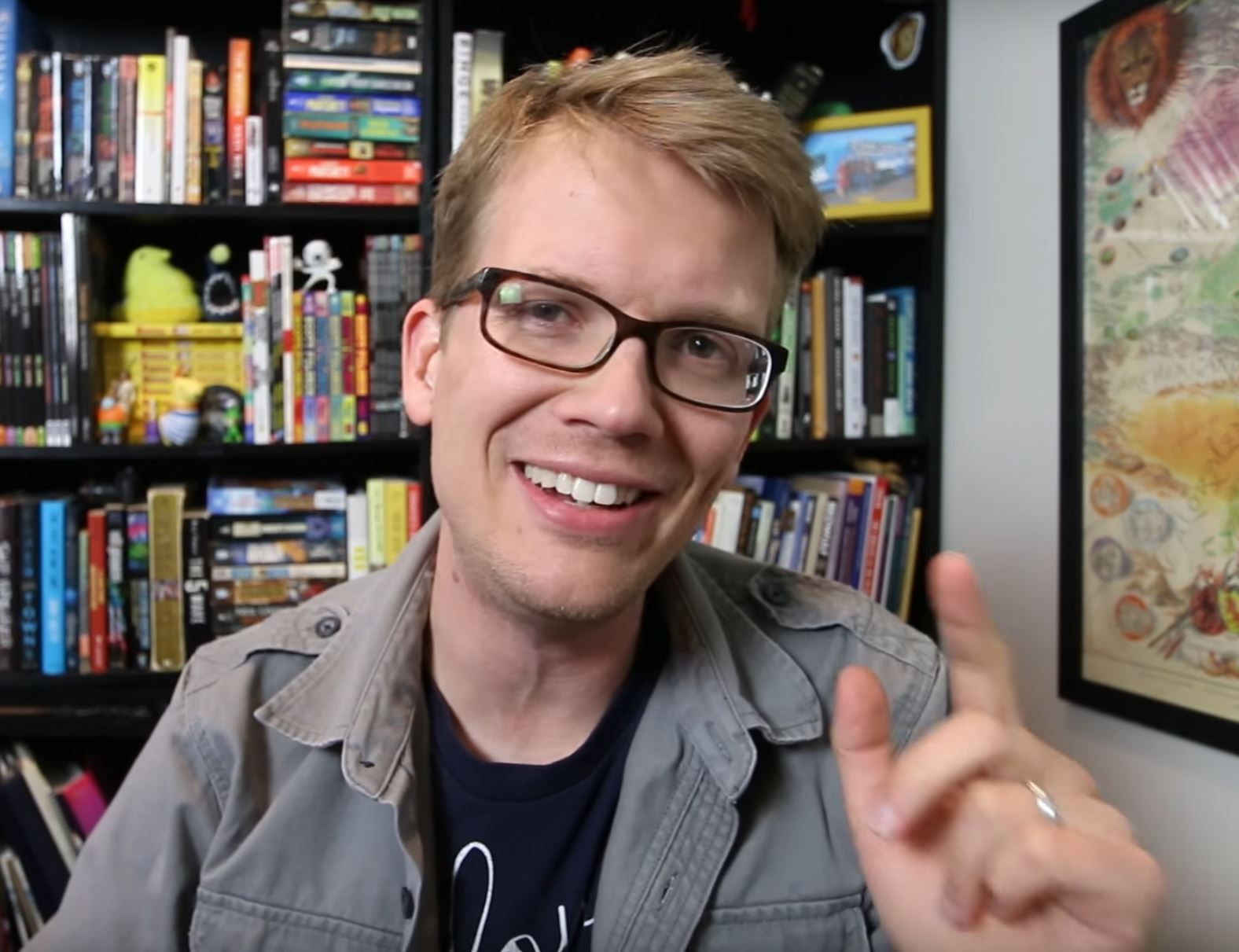
Green addressing the camera in a 2016 Vlogbrothers video

From January 1 to December 31, 2007, Hank Green and his brother John ran a video blog project titled Brotherhood 2.0. The original project ran every weekday for the entire year, with the premise that the brothers would cease all text-based ("textual") communication for the year and instead converse by daily video blogs, made available to the public via their YouTube channel Vlogbrothers and on their website.

In 2008, John and Hank first met up with their fans, known as "Nerdfighters". The first gathering was a last-minute decision, but despite the three-day notice, nearly 100 people attended. In August, John and Hank were invited to the Google office in Chicago to talk about the project. That same day, they filled the Harold Washington Library with about 400 young adults. After John's book tour for his third novel, Paper Towns, the brothers went on a national tour in November. With events in 17 different cities, they met Nerdfighters at local libraries and community centers. During this tour, Hank released his first album of Nerdfighter-themed songs, titled So Jokes.

The Green brothers have been interviewed on PotterCast, and have been recurring keynote speakers at the Harry Potter fan convention LeakyCon. The Brotherhood 2.0 project succeeded in its original mission: the brothers have come to communicate more thoroughly with each other, and have a larger influence in each other's lives than they did before the project. The brothers talked on the phone once or twice a year before Brotherhood 2.0, but, according to Hank's wife Katherine, they now "talk almost every day". John and Hank continued to post vlogs every Tuesday and Friday on their channel. Their video topics vary from explanations of current events, reunion videos, joke videos, rant videos, thoughts from various places, Question Tuesdays, and random topics. As of January 6, 2025, they have posted over 2,300 videos. The channel has more than 4 million subscribers, and its videos have been watched over 1 billion times. In light of Hank's May 2023 Hodgkin lymphoma diagnosis, the brothers announced that videos might not be released with their usual regularity, and for the first time abandoned their four-minute limit for non-educational videos to save time in making them as Hank underwent chemotherapy treatment and John took on some of Hank's responsibilities at Complexly and DFTBA Records.

==== Crash Course ====
In January 2012, Hank and John created the educational YouTube channel Crash Course, as part of the site's Original Channel Initiative. The channel features several educational courses based on the high school curriculum, and first launched with series focusing on Biology and World History. According to John, the brothers see Crash Course "as an introduction, as a way to get kids excited about learning, not as an attempt to replace traditional classroom materials." Their goal is to create "resources that allow for more valuable interaction in the classroom," with hopes that the channel will one day span the entire high school curriculum.

The two brothers initially hosted the channel, with Hank focusing on the science courses and John teaching the humanities courses. The channel has since expanded to welcome new hosts such as Craig Benzine, Phil Plait, and Emily Graslie into its roster, and has launched new courses such as Astronomy, Physics, and Philosophy. As part of YouTube Kids, a separate Crash Course: Kids channel was launched in March 2015, with Sabrina Cruz hosting a Science course geared toward a younger audience.

Crash Course has received praise from students and teachers alike. It has been awarded grants by Bill Gates' bgC3, and has struck a partnership with PBS Digital Studios to continue developing more series, although the majority of its funding comes from viewer support via Patreon. Since 2021, annual Crash Course coins have also been released, where people can buy physical tokens to support 2,000, 10,000 or (as of 2023) 20,000 learners.

==== SciShow ====
Green created the science YouTube channel SciShow in January 2012, which, like Crash Course, was initially funded by YouTube. The channel features a series of videos focused on scientific fields, including chemistry, physics, and biology, as well as interviews and trivia shows with experts. Green has said that SciShow's content aims to be approachable and to dispel the idea that science is an inherently difficult subject. Like Crash Course, SciShow is meant to be supplementary to the traditional educational experience, with Green's goal being "to be good at one thing so teachers can be good at other things."

SciShow is primarily hosted by Green, with Michael Aranda taking on additional hosting duties, as well as with occasional appearances by Lindsey Doe and Emily Graslie. A spin-off channel, SciShow Space, was launched in April 2014 to cover space topics, and is hosted by Green, Reid Reimers, and Caitlin Hofmeister. A third channel, SciShow Kids, premiered in March 2015. It is aimed at children between the ages of 3 and 6 and is hosted by Jessi Knudsen Castañeda. Late in 2016, its patrons on Patreon chose a topic for a new channel, SciShow Psych, which launched in March 2017. It is hosted by Green and Brit Garner, who teach about the human brain and aim to provide clear and reputable psychology information.

Green and SciShow were granted a national advertisement deal with YouTube that featured promotion on billboards and television commercials. The channel has been praised as "informative, casual without being condescending, and funny".

==== Others ====
PBS Eons is a PBS Digital Studios partner channel hosted by Green, SciShow writer Blake de Pastino, and paleontologist Kallie Moore. Started in 2017, it documents the history of life on Earth "from the dawn of life in the Archaean Eon ... right up to the end of the most recent Ice Age." As of June 4, 2023, Eons has over 2.6 million subscribers and 529 million views.

Started in June 2019, Journey to the Microcosmos is hosted by Green and produced by Complexly. It explores the microscopic world, with topics such as bacteria, tardigrades, and other microorganisms. Started in June 2020, Bizarre Beasts creates videos about unusual animal species. It is hosted by Green and Sarah Suta and produced by Complexly. Journey to the Microcosmos ceased production in October 2024.

In January 2025, Ask Hank Anything was launched on the Complexly YouTube channel. Hosted by Green, the show features conversations with guests, largely internet personalities, including Michelle Khare and Jacob Collier. Guests are invited to ask Green questions, often on scientific or philosophical topics.

Hank Green also hosts Hankschannel on YouTube (which now goes by the eponymous Hank Green). Launched on November 7, 2009, the channel's content ranges from opinion pieces to behind-the-scenes work on vlogbrothers videos and video explanations.

In August 2026, Green apologized to his audiences after he received criticism for his use of generative AI to assist in research for his videos. On Reddit, Green further elaborated on his use of AI, admitting his reliance on LLMs and that he was intending to reduce video production as a result.

=== As producer ===
The Lizzie Bennet Diaries was a web series created in 2012 by Green and Bernie Su and produced by Pemberley Digital. It was a modern adaptation of Jane Austen's Pride and Prejudice, Green's wife's favorite book, conveyed through vlogs. The series stars Ashley Clements, Mary Kate Wiles, Laura Spencer, and Julia Cho. The channel has over 160,000 subscribers, with more than 22.5 million video views. Green was also one of the writers of the series. Green also executively produced a number of other Pemberley Digital series, including Welcome to Sanditon (2013), Emma Approved (2014), and Frankenstein, MD (2014).

In his Vlogbrothers video uploaded on December 7, 2012, Green featured Emily Graslie, a curatorial assistant at the Philip L. Wright Zoological Museum. In this video, she showed Green a wide variety of specimens in the lab. Due to her ease in front of the camera, enthusiasm, and fan comments, Graslie was offered her own YouTube channel, The Brain Scoop, as part of the Nerdfighter family. The series debuted in January 2013. The Field Museum of Natural History acquired The Brain Scoop in 2014.

Following the success of Crash Course and SciShow, Green and his brother partnered with Mental Floss to produce and co-host a YouTube channel based on the magazine. Both brothers wrote for the magazine years before they were approached to help launch the YouTube channel. The first series, The List Show, features John presenting several interesting facts and bits of trivia related to a central topic. The channel has since launched two other series: Big Questions, hosted by Craig Benzine, and Misconceptions, hosted by Elliott Morgan. Initially, Hank was slated to host a quiz show based on his abandoned YouTube channel Truth or Fail, in which viewers would answer several questions via link annotations, jumping from video to video to find out answers and get more questions. Only one episode of the Quiz Show was released, though Hank has stayed on as producer on the other series, as well as occasionally guest hosting The List Show.

In 2014, Green partnered with Animal Wonders Inc, a nonprofit organization focused on animal rescue and animal-based education, to launch a new YouTube channel focused on animals. Animal Wonders is hosted by Jessi Knudsen Castañeda, a regular guest of the SciShow Talk Show, and founder and executive director of Animal Wonders, Inc. The channel is produced and directed by Caitlin Hofmeister and Matthew Gaydos, and features a wide range of animals residing in the animal center, as well as information on pet care, training, and animal behavior.

In 2010, Green met Lindsey Doe, a sexologist, after Doe found Green's Vlogbrothers channel and asked him to talk at a panel in her course at the University of Montana. In 2013, the two co-founded Sexplanations, a YouTube channel focused on sex education. The show has covered topics such as slut-shaming, consent, and masturbation.

How to Adult was an educational channel that gave solutions and taught life skills to new adults. It was produced by the Green brothers and hosted by T. Michael Martin and Emma Mills. The series premiered in February 2014 and ended in 2018.

Green executively produced the daily morning show Cereal Time. It began in June 2015 and was hosted by Charlotte McDonnell and Jimmy Hill. Influenced by Rhett and Link's Good Mythical Morning, the show featured McDonnell and Hill having a conversation over breakfast and discussing several topics The show went on hiatus in September 2016.

== Other media ==
=== Music ===
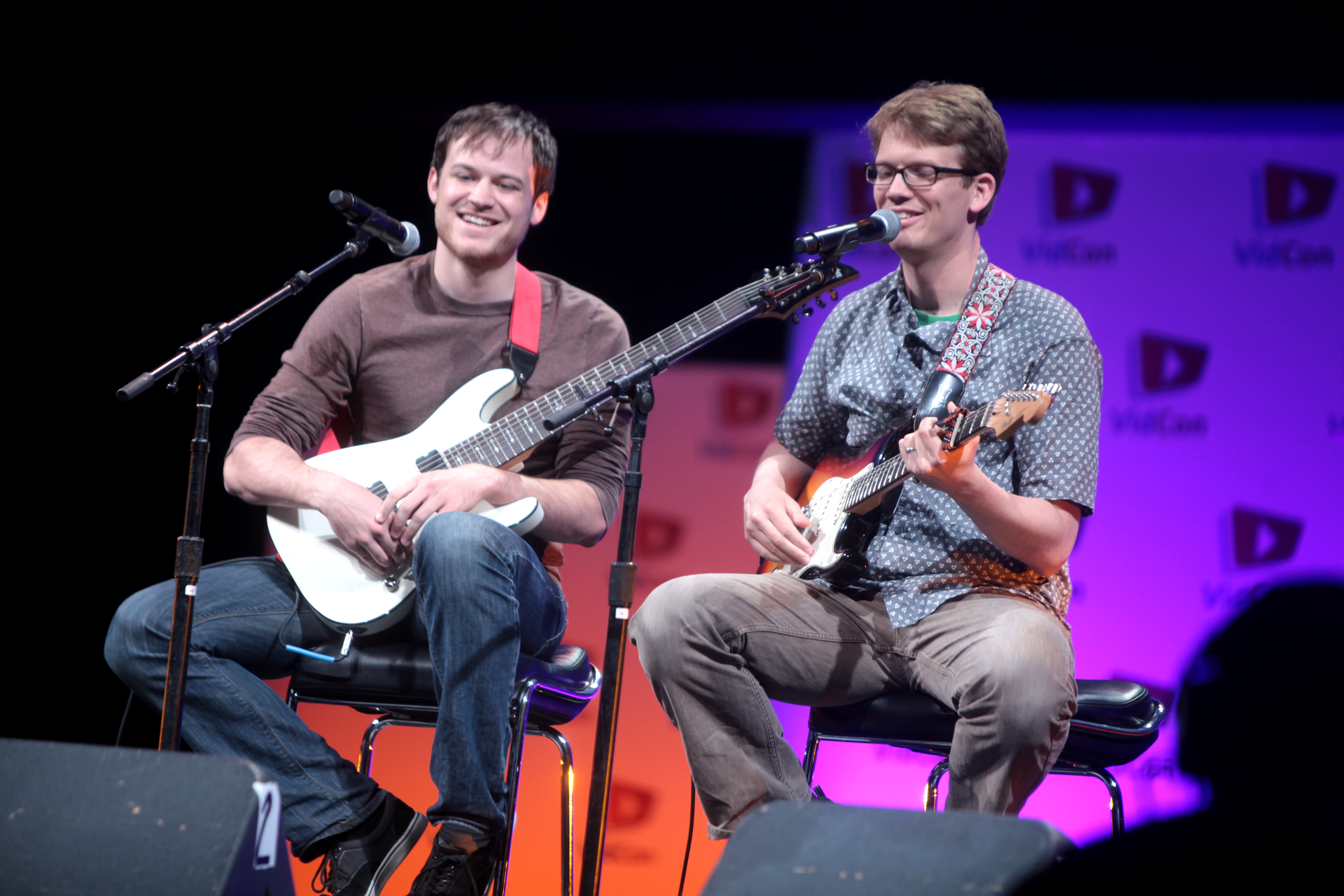
Green (right) playing guitar with Rob Scallon at Vidcon 2014

During the Brotherhood 2.0 project, Green accepted a challenge to perform an original song biweekly (on "Song Wednesdays") and he has continued, though less frequently, to write, record, and perform songs. His songs include "I'm Gonna Kill You", "Baby, I Sold Your Dog on eBay", and "What Would Captain Picard Do?". Green's first successful song was "Accio Deathly Hallows", which was featured on YouTube's front page preceding the release of the final Harry Potter book, and has been viewed over two million times.

Green's first studio album, So Jokes, was released in 2008 and reached number 22 on the Billboard Top 25 revenue generating albums online. He has since released four other albums: I'm So Bad at This: Live! (2009); This Machine Pwns n00bs (2009); Ellen Hardcastle (2011), which was named for the winner of a 2010 charity raffle; and Incongruent (2014), with his new band, Hank Green and the Perfect Strangers.

=== Novels ===
Green's debut novel, An Absolutely Remarkable Thing, was published on September 25, 2018. It is a science fiction novel about a young woman who gains overnight fame when she stumbles across an alien structure. The book debuted as a New York Times Bestseller. The sequel, A Beautifully Foolish Endeavor, was released on July 7, 2020, and was on the July 26, 2020, New York Times Bestsellers list at number 6. When signing novels, Green often includes a symbol known as the "Hanklerfish", meant to resemble an anglerfish.

=== Podcasts ===
In June 2015, the Green brothers started the weekly podcast Dear Hank & John. Holy Fucking Science was a science podcast with an "adult tone" that ran from 2017 to 2018. Delete This was launched in 2018; in it, Green and his wife Katherine look at Green's Twitter account. SciShow Tangents, also launched in 2018, is described as "a lightly competitive knowledge showcase".

=== TikTok ===
In September 2019, Green started creating content on TikTok. He has seen growing success and been called a "top creator" on TikTok by The New York Times. As of June 2023, he has over 7 million followers and over 563 million likes on his page. His content mainly consists of educational, humorous, and social-commentary videos. After a TikTok video that spoke positively about his book An Absolutely Remarkable Thing went viral, Green saw a 3,200% increase in sales on Amazon.

In April 2021, Green announced he would donate his TikTok Creator Fund revenue of over $35,000 to the First Nations Development Institute, a sum consisting of an estimated $700 from 20,000,000 TikTok views in a month as of August 2020, averaging to about 3.5 cents per 1,000 views. In January 2022, Green released a YouTube video criticizing TikTok for how it pays its creators, pointing out that due to the set value of the Creator Fund, as TikTok becomes more popular, creators earn less.

=== Comedy ===
After his cancer diagnosis in May 2023, Green began to develop a stand-up comedy routine about the disease. He performed an "unpolished and raw" version of the show in his home city of Missoula starting in July, before performing in upstate New York in October. Green recorded a comedy special titled Pissing Out Cancer that was released on the streaming service Dropout on June 21, 2024. Green's return to Dropout was announced in 2025, as a guest performer on the second season of their panel show Smartypants.

== Companies, events, and philanthropy ==
In 2007, the brothers introduced an annual charity project, the Project for Awesome (P4A), in which YouTube users take two days, originally in mid-December, to create videos promoting charities or nonprofit organizations of their choice. The amount of money raised has increased every year (with the exception of 2011). In 2021, the event was moved to late February, and a record $2,368,016 was raised.

DFTBA Records (an initialism for "Don't Forget to Be Awesome") is an e-commerce merchandise company co-founded by Green and Alan Lastufka in 2008. Originally a record label, its main focus was music generated by prominent YouTubers, including Green, Dave Days, Charlotte McDonnell, and Molly Lewis. The company now focuses on selling merchandise for prominent YouTubers. DFTBA Records has an independent distribution network. Lastufka said the record label's goal was to provide a distribution network for talented artists of YouTube and to ensure their music reaches the "largest audience possible". On June 19, 2014, Lastufka announced that he had sold his entire stake in the company and resigned as president, to pursue other projects.

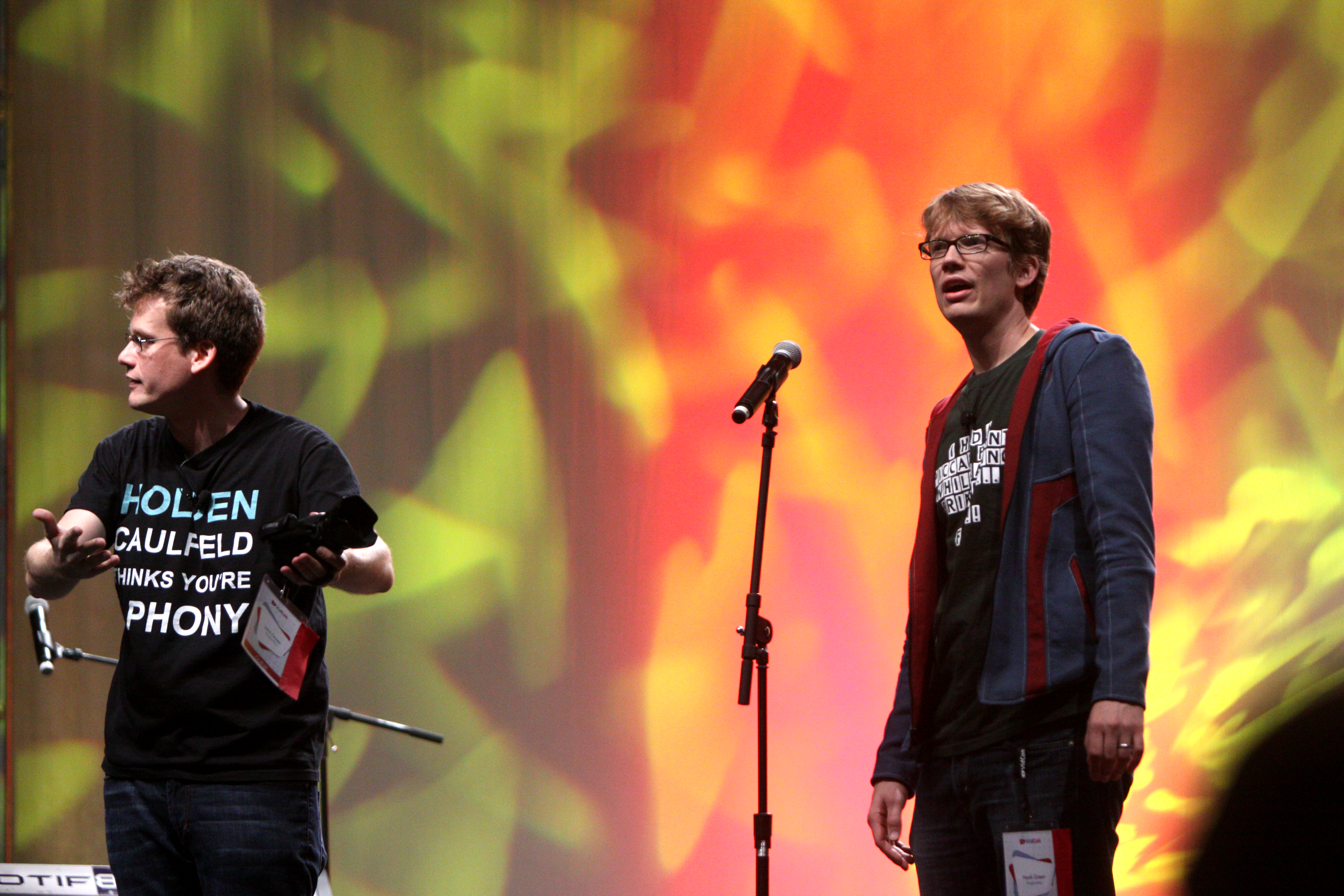
Hank (right), with his brother, John, at VidCon 2012

VidCon is an annual conference based around online video first held in 2010. The Green brothers founded VidCon in response to the growing online video community. Hank has said, "We wanted to get as much of the online video community together, in one place, in the real world for a weekend. It's a celebration of the community, with performances, concerts, and parties; but it's also a discussion of the explosion in community-based online video." VidCon was acquired by Viacom in 2018.

In 2011, Green created "2-D" glasses, which allow one to watch 3D movies without the 3D effect. The glasses were originally created for those who experience discomfort watching fixed-focus 3D movies. The 2-D glasses consist of either two right or two left lenses from a pair of regular 3D glasses.

After two years of producing Crash Course and SciShow through grants provided by YouTube, the Green brothers decided to find a more sustainable way to fund the projects. In 2013, they launched Subbable, a monthly subscription-based crowdfunding platform similar to Kickstarter that would let subscribers pledge a monthly donation to creators and receive perks in exchange by building up a pledge bank. Among the platform's initial creators and channels were the Green brothers' Crash Course and SciShow, and YouTubers CGP Grey, MinutePhysics and Wheezy Waiter. In the Subbable introduction video, Green said:

The advertising system is so ingrained that there isn't a technological solution, but there might be a cultural solution. Cultural changes need activation energy and they need catalysts. Nerdfighteria has become kind of a pretty powerful force, so I feel like Nerdfighteria can be the activation energy and Subbable could be the catalyst.

In March 2015, Patreon, another subscription-based crowdfunding platform, acquired Subbable and added Subbable's creators into its fold, with the bulk of the acquisition money going to match up to $100,000 in pledges to ease the transition. Although the two companies joining forces had been discussed since their launch, they got serious only after Amazon announced a change in its payment services that would lead Subbable creators to lose subscribers. As part of the deal, the Green brothers received a small portion of Patreon and Hank signed on as an unpaid advisor.

After VidCon's success, Green launched a new conference, NerdCon: Stories, focusing on all types of storytelling media, in 2015. He said, "Stories, of course, are an easy thing to love. They're how we understand the world ... how we pass information from person to person. I'm serious when I say that I think stories are a bit part of what makes us human, so when I was thinking of things I wanted to celebrate, that stuck out." The first NerdCon: Stories was held at the Minneapolis Convention Center in Minneapolis, Minnesota, on October 9–10, 2015. The conference attracted around 3,000 attendees, and featured guests such as Hank and John Green, Patrick Rothfuss, Maureen Johnson, Maggie Stiefvater, John Scalzi, and the Welcome to Night Vale cast and crew, among other storytellers, authors, performers, and musicians. The second NerdCon: Stories returned to the Minneapolis Convention Center on October 14–15, 2016, with many of its original guests.

In 2016, Green's LLC and production company EcoGeek was renamed Complexly (after the phrase "Imagine Others Complexly"). Complexly is the umbrella organization that produces and manages most of Hank's YouTube shows, as well as a number of other shows, podcasts, and projects. Hank was the CEO of the company from its founding until late 2023.

In June 2016, Green founded the Internet Creators Guild (ICG), the first nonprofit organization to represent online creators. After making a video explaining the new YouTube Red service to confused YouTube creators, he realized an organization representing them would better serve their needs. He established the guild as online creators had become common but were not represented by a professional organization as other industries were. He wrote on Medium that the guild's goal was to "increase the number of people in the world who can be create [sic] professionally. It will do that by providing the protection, representation and guidance that, thus far, has been tremendously lacking." The organization received $50,000 from VidCon, and VidCon staffer Laura Chernikoff served as its executive director. Green served on the advisory board alongside Burnie Burns, Akilah Hughes, Casey Neistat, and Louise Pentland. The ICG worked with creators to negotiate with sponsors, platforms, and advertisers, and to communicate with journalists and other creators. It shut down in July 2019. The board of directors said it lacked "a path to financial stability" and "a way to support the staff necessary to continue our mission." It attributed the shutdown to difficulty organizing without a physical presence, as well as a lack of interest, saying, "Creators with big audiences often don’t feel the need for support from a collective voice." Creators such as Lindsay Ellis and Philosophy Tube had criticized the ICG as only raising awareness rather than being held accountable to help its members, but the guild said this was not the cause of its closure.

In November 2026, Green announced ClockwiseTV, a subscription-based, curated video platform for children.

=== Good Store ===
In November 2020, the Green brothers started the "Awesome Socks Club", a monthly subscription service where members receive a pair of socks designed by independent artists. All post-tax profits are donated to the charity Partners in Health, in a business model similar to Newman's Own products. As of March 2022, the Awesome Socks Club had 45,000 members.

In March 2022, the brothers started the "Awesome Coffee Club", with an identical business model and goal. In mid 2024, the Awesome Coffee Club rebranded to "Keats and Co." as they began selling tea as well as coffee with a similar philosophy. The coffee is ethically sourced from Colombia via the brothers' sourcing partner, Sucafina. The beans are then roasted in St. Louis, Missouri, and distributed through DFTBA's fulfillment center in Missoula, Montana. In April 2023, they launched a third charitable company, "Sun Basin Soap".

In August 2022, Hank Green reported that the Awesome Socks Club had over 40,000 subscribers and the Awesome Coffee Club had over 10,000. In April 2023, he announced that Q1 2023 donations from the Awesome Socks Club and the Awesome Coffee Club totaled $583,911. In August 2023, the subscriptions were brought under the common branding of "Good Store".

As of August 2025, Good Store had donated over $10 million in operating profits. This included $75,000 donated to the Coral Reef Alliance. Donations raised through Good Store and the Project for Awesome contributed to the construction of the Paul E. Farmer Maternal Center of Excellence in Koidu, Sierra Leone. It opened to patients in 2026. In total, Hank and John Green contributed $50 million towards the hospital.

=== Focus Friend ===
In July 2025, Green partnered with Honey B Games to launch Focus Friend, a productivity app that allows users to set a timer that temporarily blocks other apps. The app features an anthropomorphic bean, which knits and gives in-game points while the timer runs.These points can be used to change the bean's home and appearance In August, the app reached number one on Apple's App Store charts for free apps. The app was named Google Play's "App of the Year" for 2025. Apple Inc. named the app one of its "Cultural Impact Winners" in their 2025 App Store Awards.

=== Political events ===
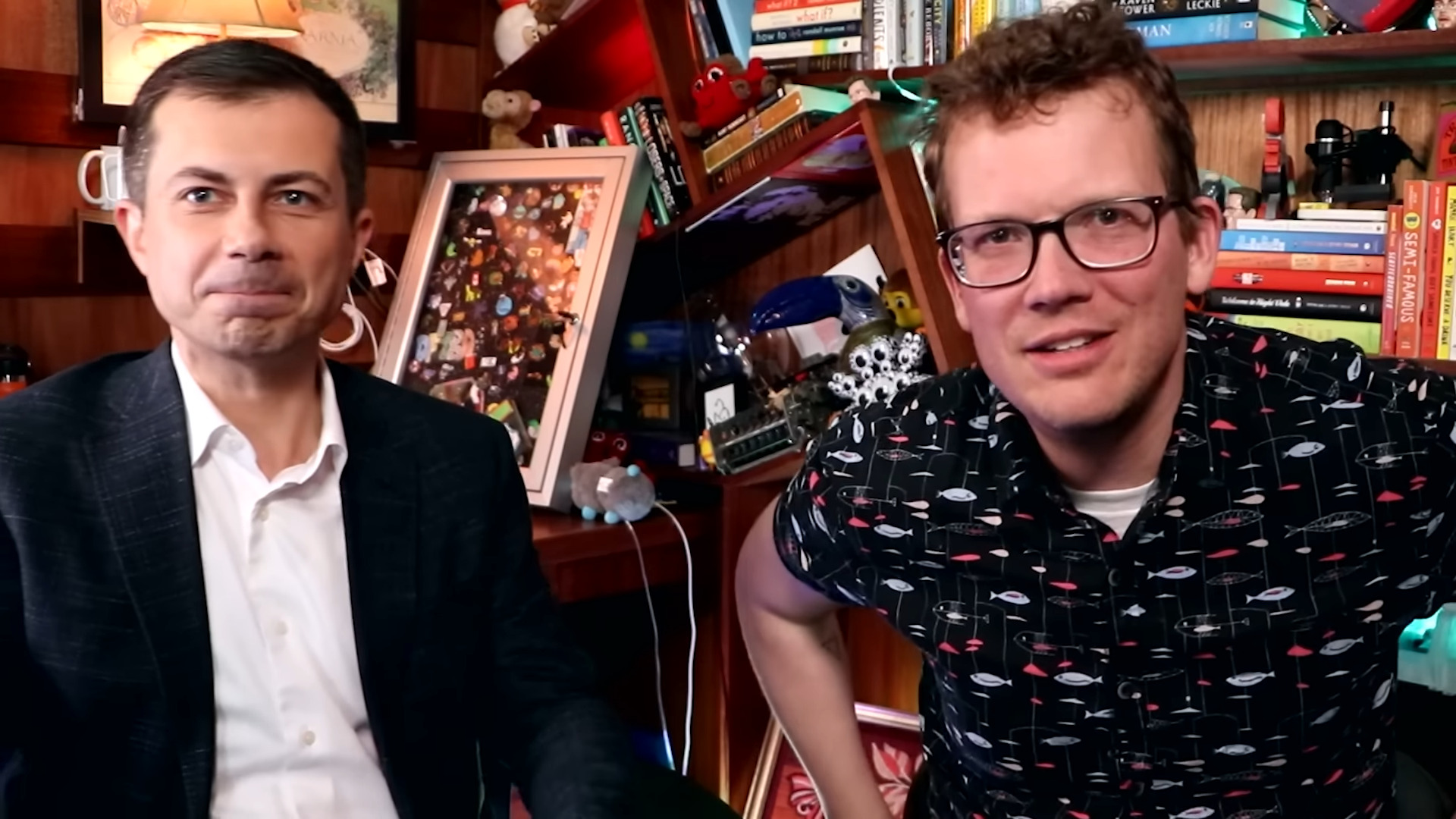
Green with Pete Buttigieg

In January 2015, Green interviewed President Obama at The White House as part of a group of YouTube creators Google organized to talk to Obama. In September 2022, during the lead-up to the 2022 United States House of Representatives elections in Montana, Green interviewed Democrat Monica Tranel, who ran for Montana's 1st congressional district, in Missoula. He hosted a second event in Bozeman, Montana, in October, though he did not explicitly endorse Tranel. In May 2024, he interviewed United States Secretary of Transportation Pete Buttigieg.

== Personal life ==
Green's announcement of his cancer diagnosis in 2023

Hank Green resides in Missoula, Montana, with his wife Katherine Green and their son.

Green was diagnosed with ulcerative colitis in 2003. As a child, he was diagnosed with sensory integration dysfunction and ADD. When asked if he considers himself an atheist, he said, "I don't believe there's a God, but I'm not comfortable saying that there is no God." He is bisexual.

In May 2023, Green announced that he had been diagnosed with Hodgkin lymphoma, a type of cancer that affects the lymphatic system. He received letters of encouragement from President Joe Biden and NASA administrator and former Florida Senator Bill Nelson. Three months later, he announced that his oncologist told him in a post-treatment follow-up exam that he is in "complete remission".

== Works ==
=== Books ===
- An Absolutely Remarkable Thing (2018)
- A Beautifully Foolish Endeavor (2020)
- The Book of Good Times (2024)

=== Other ===
- Foreword to Pride and Prejudice (2014 Lizzie Bennet Diaries edition)
- A Supplementally Useful Publication (2020)
- "A Naturalist on Hoth", From a Certain Point of View: The Empire Strikes Back (2020)
- "Bonker Doesn't Die" (2021 Project for Awesome short story)

=== Filmography ===
| Year | Title | Credited as | | | | Notes |
| Year | Title | Host | Writer | Producer | Executive producer | Notes |
|---|---|---|---|---|---|---|
| 2012–present | SciShow | Yes | Yes | | Yes | Hosted by Green, Michael Aranda and others |
| 2012 | Crash Course: World History | | | | Yes | Hosted by John Green |
| 2012 | Crash Course: Biology | Yes | Yes | | Yes | Host (40 episodes) |
| 2012–2013 | The Lizzie Bennet Diaries | | Yes | | Yes | Co-creator; writer (2 episodes); editor; based on Pride and Prejudice by Jane Austen |
| 2012–2013 | Crash Course: Ecology | Yes | Yes | | Yes | Host (12 episodes) |
| 2012–2013 | Crash Course: English Literature | | | | Yes | Hosted by John Green |
| 2013–2014 | The Brain Scoop | | | | Yes | Hosted by Emily Graslie; later produced by The Field Museum |
| 2013–2014 | Crash Course: U.S. History | | | | Yes | Hosted by John Green |
| 2013–2014 | Crash Course: Chemistry | Yes | Yes | | Yes | Host (46 episodes) |
| 2013–2018 | mental_floss: List Show | | | Yes | | Hosted by John Green |
| 2013 | Welcome to Sanditon | | | | Yes | Based on Sanditon by Jane Austen |
| 2013–2021 | Sexplanations | | | | Yes | Hosted by Lindsey Doe |
| 2013–2014 | Emma Approved | | | | Yes | Based on Emma by Jane Austen |
| 2014 | Crash Course: Psychology | Yes | | | Yes | Host (40 episodes) |
| 2014 | Crash Course: Literature 2 | | | | Yes | Hosted by John Green |
| 2014–2018 | How to Adult | | | | Yes | Hosted by T. Michael Martin and Emma Mills |
| 2014–2023 | SciShow Space | Yes | | | Yes | Hosted by Green, Reid Reimers, and Caitlin Hofmeister |
| 2014–2023 | Animal Wonders | | | | Yes | Hosted by Jessi Knudsen Castañeda |
| 2014–2015 | Crash Course: World History 2 | | | | Yes | Hosted by John Green |
| 2015 | Titansgrave: The Ashes of Valkana | | | | | Actual play as Aankia (11 Episodes + BTS) |
| 2014 | Frankenstein, MD | | | | Yes | Based on Frankenstein by Mary Shelley |
| 2014–2015 | Crash Course: Big History | Yes | | | Yes | Hosted by Green, John Green, and Emily Graslie |
| 2014–2018 | mental_floss: Big Questions | | | Yes | | Hosted by Craig Benzine |
| 2014–2016 | mental_floss: Misconceptions | | | Yes | | Hosted by Elliott Morgan |
| 2015 | Crash Course: Anatomy & Physiology | Yes | | | Yes | Host (47 episodes) |
| 2015–2016 | Crash Course: Astronomy | | | | Yes | Hosted by Phil Plait |
| 2015–2016 | Crash Course: U.S. Government & Politics | | | | Yes | Hosted by Craig Benzine |
| 2015–2016 | Crash Course Kids: Science | | | | Yes | Hosted by Sabrina Cruz |
| 2015–2018 | SciShow Kids | | | | Yes | Hosted by Jessi Knudsen Castañeda |
| 2015 | Crash Course: Intellectual Property | | | | Yes | Hosted by Stan Muller |
| 2015–2016 | Cereal Time | | | | Yes | Hosted by Charlotte McDonnell (formerly Charlie McDonnell) and Jimmy Hill |
| 2015–2016 | Crash Course: Economics | | | | Yes | Hosted by Adriene Hill and Jacob Clifford |
| 2015–present | The Financial Diet | | | | Yes | Hosted by Chelsea Fagan and Lauren Ver Hage |
| 2016–2017 | Crash Course: Philosophy | Yes | | | Yes | Host |
| 2016–2017 | Crash Course: Physics | | | | Yes | Hosted by Shini Somara |
| 2016 | Crash Course: Games | | | | Yes | Hosted by Andre Meadows |
| 2017–present | Scishow Psych | Yes | | | Yes | Hosted by Green and Brit Garner |
| 2017–2022 | PBS Eons | Yes | | | Yes | Hosted by Green, Blake de Pastino, and Kallie Moore |
| 2018–2019 | Crash Course: History of Science | Yes | | | Yes | Host |
| 2019–2024 | Journey to the Microcosmos | Yes | Yes | | Yes | Music by Andrew Huang, cinematography and microbiology specimens by James Weiss, narrated by Hank Green. |
| 2020–present | Bizarre Beasts | Yes | | | Yes | Host and executive producer |
| 2023 | Dimension 20: Mentopolis | | | | | Actual play as The Fix (6 episodes) |
| 2024 | Hank Green: Pissing Out Cancer | | | | | Recording of Green's stand-up show at Dynasty Typewriter in Los Angeles; it is the first special of the "Dropout Presents" series |
| 2025 | Hamster & Gretel | | | | | Voice of Dr. Aster (season 2, episode 15: "Gentlemen Prefer Fronds") |
| 2025 | Smartypants | | | | | Presenter (season 2, episode 5: "Grocery Stores, Society, Parents") |
| 2025 | QI | | | | | Panellist (season W, episode 2: "Wings and Wheels") |
| 2025 | "The Clashteroid" | | | | | Hank (Clash of Clans commercial) |
| 2026 | Taskmaster | | | | | Uncredited cameo (season 21, episode 8: "I don't got any.") |

=== Discography ===
Hank Green discography
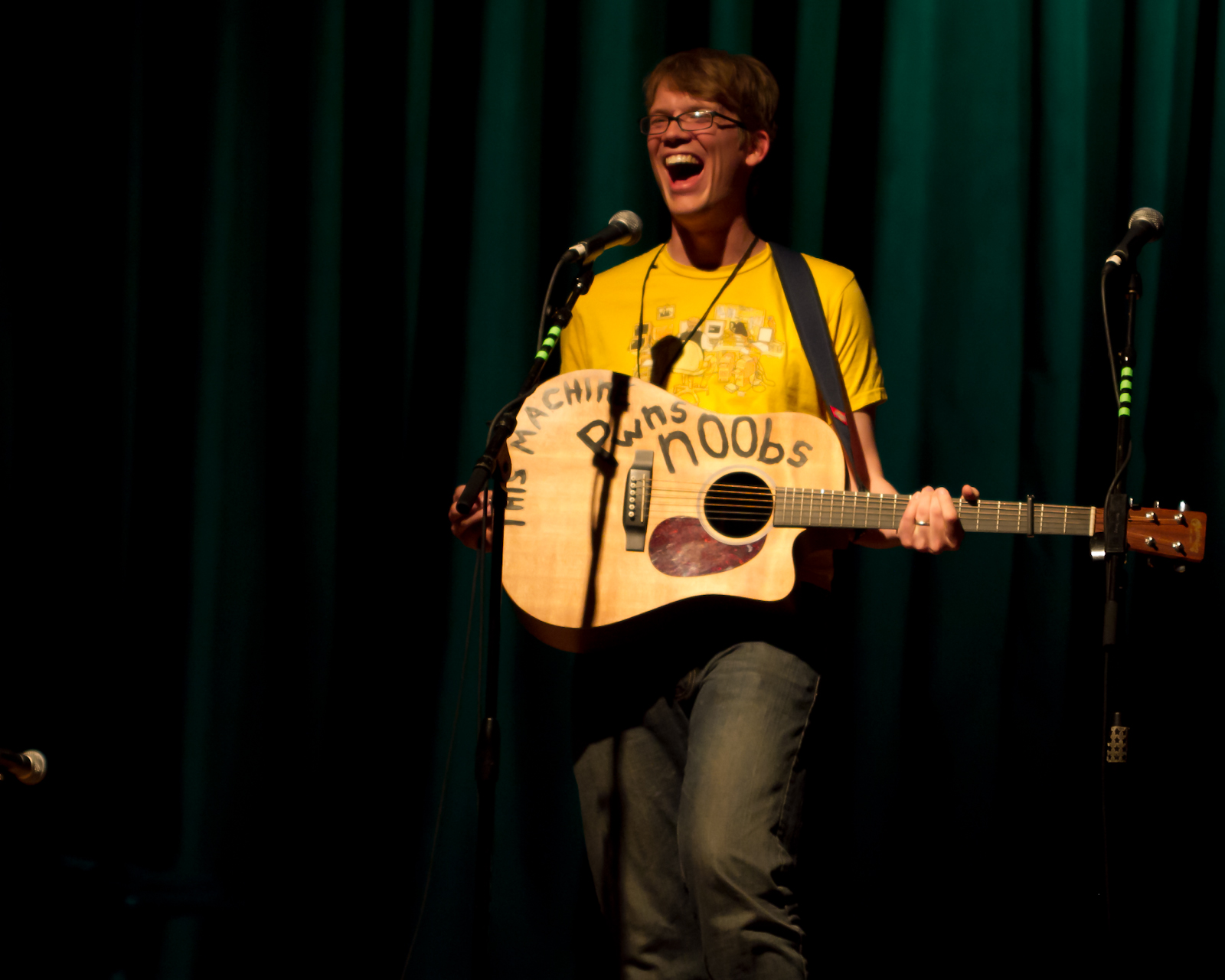
- Hank Green
- Studio albums: 4
- Extended plays: 1
- Live albums: 1

==== Studio albums ====
List of albums, with selected information
| Title | Album details | Peak chart positions | |
| Title | Album details | US Heat | US Comedy |
|---|---|---|---|
| So Jokes | Released: January 20, 2008; Label: DFTBA Records; Formats: Digital download | — | — |
| This Machine Pwns N00bs | Released: November 16, 2009; Label: DFTBA Records; Formats: CD, Digital download | — | — |
| Ellen Hardcastle | Released: July 13, 2011; Label: DFTBA Records; Formats: CD, Digital download | — | 8 |
| Incongruent (as Hank Green & the Perfect Strangers) | Released: 2014; Label: DFTBA Records; Formats: CD, Digital download | 29 | 3 |

==== Live albums ====
List of albums, with selected information
| Title | Album details |
|---|---|
| I'm So Bad at This: Live | Released: August 1, 2009; Label: DFTBA Records; Formats: Digital download |

==== Compilation albums ====
List of albums, with selected information
| Title | Album details |
|---|---|
| The Harry Potter Songs! | Released: 2014; Label: DFTBA Records; Formats: CD |
| The Drive | Released: 2014; Label: DFTBA Records; Formats: USB flash drive |

==== Singles ====
| Title | Year | Peak chart positions | Album |
| Title | Year | US Comedy Dig. | Album |
|---|---|---|---|
| "Farmville" | 2011 | — | Ellen Hardcastle |
| "My Favorite Pony" | 2012 | — | non-album singles |
| "My Favorite Pony (Acoustic)" | 2012 | — | non-album singles |
| "The Universe is Weird" | 2014 | — | Incongruent |
| "We Are All Batpeople" (with John Green featuring The Gregory Brothers) | 2015 | 11 | non-album single |

==== Other appearances ====
| Title | Year | Other artist(s) | Album |
|---|---|---|---|
| "A Song about an Anglerfish" | 2009 | —N/a | DFTBA Records, Volume One |
| "Porphyrophobia" | 2010 | —N/a | Taking Back the Covers, Vol. 1 |
| "Bangs" | 2011 | —N/a | Mink Car Cover |
| "The Kidney That Lived in Four People" | 2014 | Danny Weinkauf | No School Today |
| "Hobbit Drinking Medley" | 2016 | Peter Hollens | Misty Mountains: Songs Inspired by The Hobbit and Lord of the Rings |
| "William Rowan Hamilton" | 2016 | A Capella Science, Coma Niddy, Helen Arney, Baba Brinkman, Tom McFadden, Simon Clark, Veritasium | non-album single |
| "Dear Mr. Potter (Live)" | 2016 | —N/a | LeakyCon 2011: Live at the Leaky Cauldron II |
| "This Is Not Harry Potter (Live)" | 2016 | —N/a | LeakyCon 2011: Live at the Leaky Cauldron II |
| "Accio Deathly Hallows (Live)" | 2016 | —N/a | LeakyCon 2011: Live at the Leaky Cauldron II |

== See also ==
- List of YouTubers
