= Big Marvel =

South Korean YouTuber (born 1992/1993)

- Born: Hwang Myeong-hun

YouTube information
- Channel: BigMarvel
- Subscribers: 16.9 million
- Views: 9.0 billion
- Last updated: January 2026

Hwang Myeong-hun (Korean: 황명훈; born 1992 or 1993), also known by his stage name Big Marvel (빅마블), is a South Korean YouTuber and musician, best known for performing song covers on his YouTube Channel using a rubber chicken as a musical instrument.

Hwang first received significant public attention after he won a 2012 beatboxing competition. Hwang claimed in a 2018 interview that 96% of his viewers were from overseas. In 2019, he won an award at the international YouTuber convention VidCon.

Sometime during 2019, Hwang would go on to form the South Korean boy group Off The Cuff (OTC), consisting of 9 models, YouTubers, Instagram influencers, buskers, and trainees.
