= VidCon =

Annual convention

- Status: Active
- Genre: Online video influencer conference
- Venue: Hyatt Regency Century Plaza (2010–2011); Anaheim Convention Center (2012–2026)
- Locations: Los Angeles, California (2010–2011); Anaheim, California (2012–2026); Nashville, Tennessee (2027–present)
- Country: United States
- Inaugurated: July 9, 2010; 16 years ago
- Most recent: June 25–27, 2026
- Next event: Fall 2027
- Attendance: 75,000 (2019)
- Organizer: Independent (2010–2018); Viacom (2018–2019); Paramount Global (2019–2024); Informa (2024–present)
- Website: vidcon.com

VidCon (set to be rebranded as VidCon x LIONS Creators) is an annual multi-genre online video tech convention conference for influencers, fans, executives, YouTubers, and online brands held annually since 2010. The event primarily features prominent video stars from across the internet. It was founded by veteran YouTube creators John and Hank Green (Vlogbrothers), and was later acquired by Viacom (now Paramount Skydance) in 2018 and later acquired by Informa in 2024. Its offices remain in Missoula, Montana, sharing a building with Complexly. VidCon held additional events internationally in Netherlands, United Kingdom, Australia, Singapore, UAE and Mexico. In October 2020, VidCon Now relaunched as an ongoing, free digital offering.

== History ==
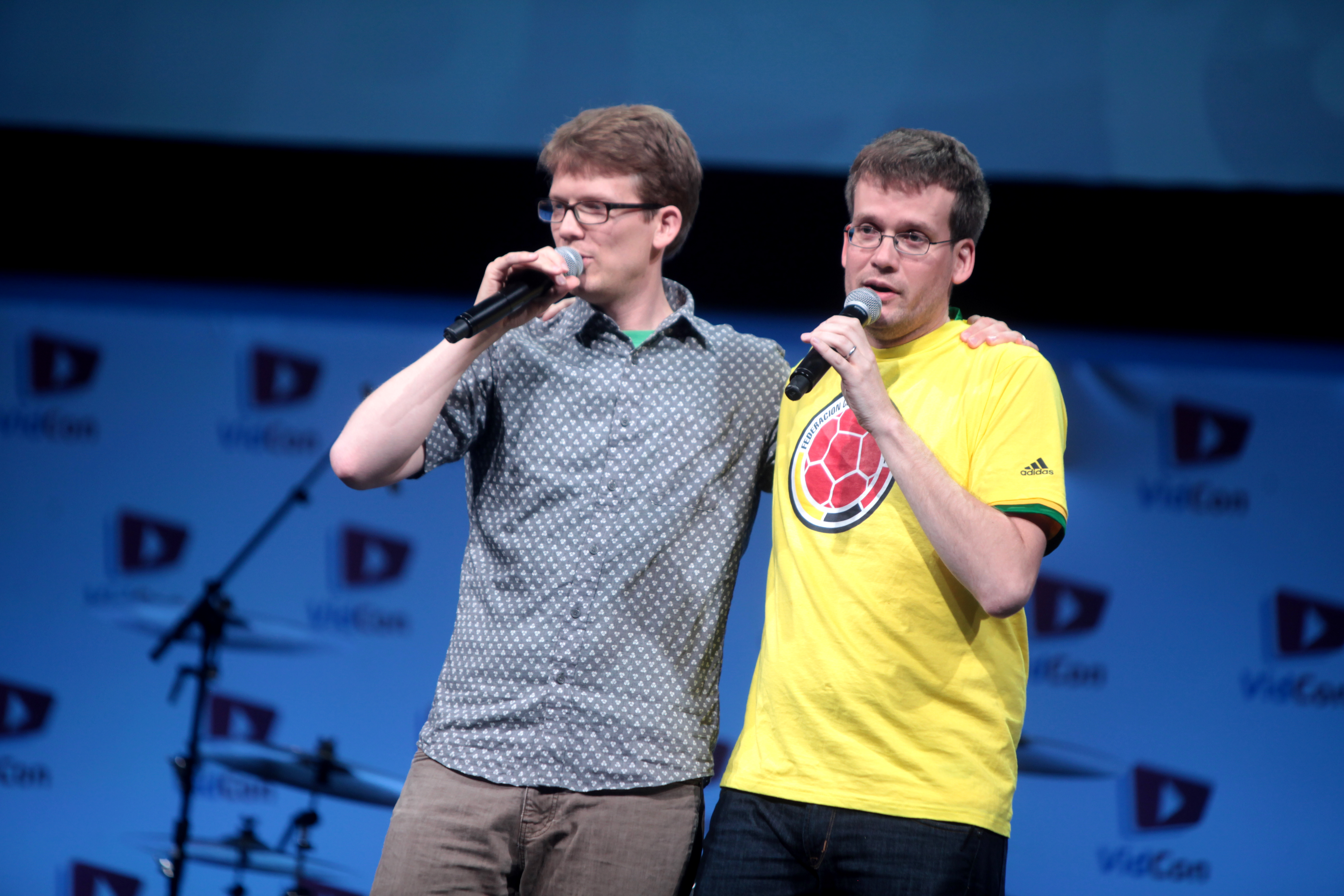
VidCon founders Hank and John Green at VidCon 2014

The first VidCon was held on July 9–11, 2010, at the Hyatt Regency Century Plaza hotel in Los Angeles and sold out in advance, with over 1,400 people attending. On August 29, 2017, Jim Louderback was named as CEO of the convention, replacing Hank Green.

People with disabilities are offered assistance throughout the convention. Special accessible seating is provided along with ASL interpreters present in the arena and main stage.

=== Viacom acquisition ===
In February 2018, Viacom (owner of the Viacom Media Networks and film studio Paramount Pictures) announced that they were acquiring VidCon, as part of its efforts to increase its live events business and expand beyond television. Louderback remained the CEO of the convention, and co-founder Hank Green continued his involvement. Its offices continued to exist in Missoula, Montana. Internet reception to this acquisition was mixed, with some noting the irony of Viacom acquiring VidCon a decade after their lawsuit against Google and YouTube for copyright infringement. Hank Green reassured fans that Viacom's acquisition was a positive development that would help the convention's growth.

==== COVID-19 pandemic ====
Three conferences were cancelled in 2020 due to the COVID-19 pandemic, and a series of online programming, VidCon Now, became available for registration.

In 2019, VidCon announced that the 11th U.S. VidCon event would be held from June 17, through June 20, 2020, but on March 23, 2020, they announced that all international VidCon events were suspended due to the COVID-19 pandemic including Mexico, U.S., and Abu Dhabi.

On April 27, 2020, VidCon announced that Australia 2020 would not return in 2020 due to the COVID-19 pandemic and would be on hiatus.

In March 2021, VidCon announced that it would host its next U.S. conference at the Anaheim Convention Center from October 22–24, 2021, delayed from its usual summer scheduling in order to increase the chance that an in-person event could be held. VidCon also announced that TikTok would be the top sponsor of the 2021 event, replacing YouTube who had been the main sponsor since 2013. On August 20, however, VidCon announced the cancellation of its 2021 event "due to the recent increases in COVID-19 cases [in California] and evolving health and safety mandates." The convention was rescheduled to June 22–25, 2022 in Anaheim. In 2022, VidCon announced that it was addding a second U.S. event in Baltimore for 2023. The 2023 Anaheim event was held between June 21–24, with YouTube returning as the sponsor; while the Baltimore event was held between September 29 and October 1.

With the flagship convention in Anaheim, International editions such as VidCon London, VidCon Australia, and VidCon Asia have not yet returned. A limited expansion has continued in Mexico City, but no other international locations have been announced.

=== Fan Expo acquisition, rebrand and relocation ===
In April 2024, Viacom's successor Paramount Global hired Oaklins DeSilva+Phillips to locate a buyer for VidCon. During those negotiations, in July 2024, VidCon announced the cancellation of its 2024 Baltimore event, with the company stating that it will "dedicate its full efforts and resources to VidCon's flagship event in Anaheim". In August 2024, Paramount completed the sale of VidCon to Informa, with the convention being moved under its Fan Expo HQ unit. Following the acquisition, Informa executives stated their ambition to eventually bring VidCon back to global markets, describing Anaheim as the "Super Bowl for creators" and indicating that international expansion may be revisited in the future.

For the 2026 event, Pop Store became the main sponsor for VidCon Anaheim 2026 replacing YouTube for the second time after TikTok became the sponsor in the 2022 event.

In September, after originally setting a July 8–10, 2027 date in Anaheim, Informa announced the rebrand of the convention as "VidCon x LIONS Creators", also merging the Lions Creators program of the Cannes Lions convention; it will be held in Fall 2027 in Nashville with the VidCon brand being present at the Insight to Impact conference and Cannes Lions 2027.

== Events ==
Event	Date	Venue	City	Country	Attendance	Ref.
VidCon 2010	July 9–11, 2010	Hyatt Regency Century Plaza	Los Angeles, California	United States	1,400	
VidCon 2011	July 28–30, 2011	Hyatt Regency Century Plaza	Los Angeles, California	United States	2,500	
VidCon 2012	June 29–30, 2012	Anaheim Convention Center	Anaheim, California	United States	7,000	
VidCon 2013	August 1–3, 2013	Anaheim Convention Center	Anaheim, California	United States	12,000	
VidCon 2014	June 26–28, 2014	Anaheim Convention Center	Anaheim, California	United States	18,000	
VidCon 2015	July 23–25, 2015	Anaheim Convention Center	Anaheim, California	United States	20,000	
VidCon 2016	June 23–25, 2016	Anaheim Convention Center	Anaheim, California	United States	26,400	
VidCon Europe 2017	April 8–9, 2017	RAI Amsterdam Convention Centre	Amsterdam, North Holland	Netherlands	3,500	
VidCon 2017	June 22–24, 2017	Anaheim Convention Center	Anaheim, California	United States	31,000	
VidCon Australia 2017	September 9–10, 2017	Melbourne Convention and Exhibition Centre	Melbourne, Victoria	Australia		
VidCon Europe 2018	March 22–24, 2018	Mövenpick Hotel Amsterdam	Amsterdam, North Holland	Netherlands		
VidCon 2018	June 20–23, 2018	Anaheim Convention Center	Anaheim, California	United States	75,000	
VidCon Australia 2018	August 31 – September 2, 2018	Melbourne Convention and Exhibition Centre	Melbourne, Victoria	Australia	7,000+	
VidCon London 2019	February 14–17, 2019	ExCeL London	London, England	United Kingdom	13,000	
VidCon 2019	July 10–13, 2019	Anaheim Convention Center	Anaheim, California	United States	75,000	
VidCon Australia 2019	September 19–22, 2019	Melbourne Convention and Exhibition Centre	Melbourne, Victoria	Australia		
VidCon Asia	December 3–4, 2019	Raffles City Convention Center	Downtown Core	Singapore	600+	
VidCon London 2020	February 20–23, 2020	ExCeL London	London, England	United Kingdom		
VidCon Anaheim 2020	The 11th U.S. VidCon event was scheduled for June 17–20, 2020, but it was cancelled due to the COVID-19 pandemic.					
VidCon Mexico 2020	The first Mexico VidCon event was scheduled for April 30 – May 3, 2020, but it was postponed to September 17–20, 2020 and was cancelled and rescheduled to 2021 due to the COVID-19 pandemic.					
VidCon Abu Dhabi 2020	The first Abu Dubai VidCon event was scheduled for March 25–28, 2020, but it was postponed to December 16–18, before being cancelled and rescheduled to 2021 due to the COVID-19 pandemic.					
VidCon Anaheim 2021	The 2021 event was scheduled to be held from October 22–24, 2021, but it was postponed to June 22–25, 2022, due to the COVID-19 cases increasing in California.					
VidCon Asia 2021	November 25, 2021	Suntec Convention Centre	Marina Centre	Singapore		
VidCon Abu Dhabi	December 3–6, 2021	Abu Dhabi National Exhibition Centre	Abu Dhabi	United Arab Emirates		
VidCon Mexico 2021	December 3–6, 2021	Citibanamex Center	Mexico City	Mexico		
VidCon 2022	June 22–25, 2022	Anaheim Convention Center	Anaheim, California	United States	50,000	
VidCon Mexico 2022	September 23–25, 2022	Citibanamex Center	Mexico City	Mexico		
VidCon Anaheim 2023	June 21–24, 2023	Anaheim Convention Center	Anaheim, California	United States	55,000	
VidCon Baltimore 2023	September 29 – October 1, 2023	Baltimore Convention Center	Baltimore, Maryland	United States		
VidCon Anaheim 2024	June 26–29, 2024	Anaheim Convention Center	Anaheim, California	United States	55,000	
VidCon Mexico 2024	August 9–11, 2024	Citibanamex Center	Mexico City	Mexico		
VidCon Baltimore 2024	The event was planned to take place from September 26–29, 2024, at the Baltimore Convention Center. However, on July 19, 2024, Vidon announced that the event would be cancelled after deciding to focus on its resources on its 2025 Anaheim event.					
VidCon Anaheim 2025	June 19–21, 2025	Anaheim Convention Center	Anaheim, California	United States		
VidCon Anaheim 2026	June 25–27, 2026	Anaheim Convention Center	Anaheim, California	United States		
VidCon x LIONS Creators 2027	Fall 2027	TBA	Nashville, Tennessee	United States		

== International conventions ==
Convention	Country	Location(s)	Venue	Inaugural event	Most recent
VidCon London (Formerly VidCon Europe)	Netherlands (2017–2018); United Kingdom (2019–2020)	Amsterdam (2017–2018); London (2019–2020)	RAI Amsterdam Convention Centre (2017); Mövenpick Hotel Amsterdam (2018); ExCeL London (2019–2020)	April 8–9, 2017	February 20–23, 2020
VidCon Australia	Australia	Melbourne	Melbourne Convention and Exhibition Centre	September 9–10, 2017	September 19–22, 2019
VidCon Asia	Singapore	Singapore	Raffles City Convention Centre	December 3–4, 2019	November 25, 2021
VidCon Abu Dhabi	United Arab Emirates	Abu Dhabi	Abu Dhabi National Exhibition Centre	December 3–6, 2021	—
VidCon Mexico	Mexico	Mexico City	Citibanamex Center	May 6–9, 2021	August 9–11, 2024
