= Pissing Out Cancer =

Comedy special by Hank Green

- Title card
- Created by: Hank Green
- Directed by: Jonah Ray

Original release
- Network: Dropout
- Release: June 12, 2024

Pissing Out Cancer is a comedy special by Internet personality and entrepreneur Hank Green, released on Dropout in 2024. The special centers around Green's experience of Hodgkin lymphoma, which he was diagnosed with in May 2023. While still in treatment, Green began testing stand-up comedy material; Sam Reich of Dropout.tv, having been sent a clip of Green's work, offered him a full special, which he accepted after initial hesitation about "cut[ting] the line" of other performers. Green's special – inspired in part by comedians like Tig Notaro and John Mulaney – follows his experience of having cancer, interspersed with comedic tangents, an explanation of cancer, and reflections on beauty and positivity in life despite its challenges. Pissing Out Cancer was received positively by critics in the news media and on the internet.

== Background ==
In May 2023, Internet personality and entrepreneur Hank Green announced that he was diagnosed with Hodgkin lymphoma. Green had been a noted content creator since 2007, when he and his brother John Green launched the YouTube channel Vlogbrothers together; the two continued their success with other collaborative and solo projects, including books, YouTube channels, podcasts, and philanthropic work. After the announcement, Hank reduced his creative output significantly, although he did post updates about going through chemotherapy; in August, he announced that he was in complete remission. As early as July, while still in treatment, he had been testing stand-up comedy material every week with a coach and various audiences in Missoula, Montana; once he felt the material was polished enough, he started performing in other places, including upstate New York.

== Production and release ==
While touring, Green sent clips of his work to various comedians for feedback on how to improve; one of those comedians was Sam Reich, owner of streaming service Dropout.tv. Reich asked Green to perform a full comedy special on Dropout, the first in a series of specials called Dropout Presents. Green had already appeared on another one of Dropout's shows, Dimension 20; he had also been approached to make an appearance on Game Changer, but ultimately declined. Green recounted being hesitant to go first on account of not being a professional comedian, saying, "I don't want people to feel like I'm cutting in line"; Reich said that he convinced Green by telling him that he would bring attention to the other acts. Green recounted wanting to engage a larger audience on his experience of cancer.

Pissing Out Cancer was filmed at the Dynasty Typewriter theater in Los Angeles and released on June 12, 2024; It was Green's first comedy special. According to Green, he arrived in L.A. early and did eight shows in the six days before the special to practice, rewriting the ending the night before filming. The show was shot twice, in order to adjust for possible mistakes; however, his rewrite of the ending, which made it into the finished version, was only performed once. Green cited as influences comedians Taylor Tomlinson, Mike Birbiglia, and Josh Johnson, as well as comedy sets addressing cancer like Tig Notaro's Live and Nimesh Patel's Lucky Lefty. He also cited John Mulaney's special on his story with addiction, Baby J, as the reason he decided to present his special as a cohesive story, and Keanu Reeves for his rewriting of the ending. Green's original ending was a reflection on whether he would successfully beat his cancer in the long run or not; he added "[e]ither way, what comes next is going to be beautiful", which he says was based on Reeves' statement on what happens after people die, "I know the ones who love us will miss us".

The special began streaming on Dropout in June 2025; Green posted it to his personal YouTube channel six months later on December 11, 2025.

== Synopsis ==
Pissing Out Cancer mainly explores Green's experience of Hodgkin lymphoma; the opening line of the show is "so I got cancer". He explains the biology of cancer, comparing a cancer cell to a hypothetical rogue, selfish ant named "Trent". He also talks about the experience of having cancer, touching on the United States healthcare system and the physical consequences. The special is interwoven with tangents – at one point, he recounts a fever dream involving assassination of the Baltimore Orioles, and his discussion of Trent the ant is presented along memory of a conversation he had with his doctor. Green's special alternates between a dissection of the hardship of cancer and his contention that life can still be positive and contain good surprises.

== Reception ==
Reviewers gave Pissing Out Cancer generally positive feedback. Writing for Decider, Sean McCarthy recommended Pissing Out Cancer with a "B+" grade; he noted that Green was not the first person to structure a comedy set around a severe illness, but said that Green might be the first "in translating the complex science and nature of his particular condition through comedy". Rachel Ulatowski, writing in The Mary Sue, praised Green for the wide range of creative works he has produced; she also noted that internet commenters had praised Pissing Out Cancer for providing an educational and personal insight into cancer, and commenters with cancer said that the humor Green put into his bleak situation helped them cope with their own diagnoses.
