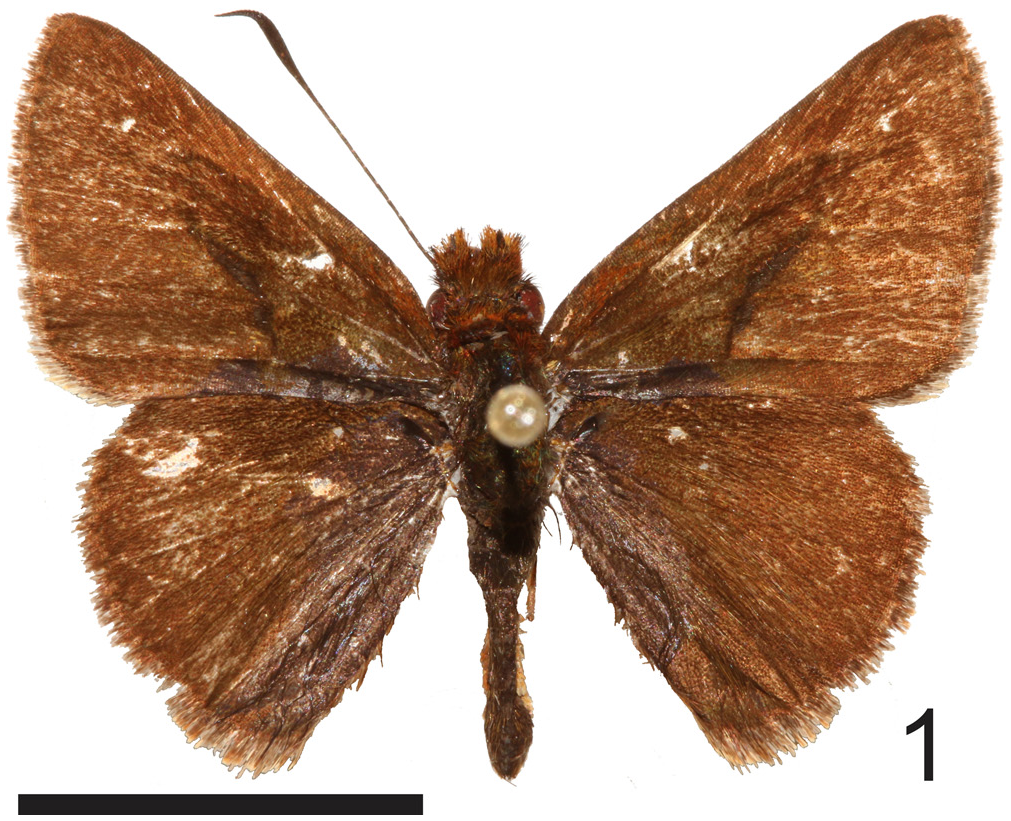
- Dorsal view of male holotype (bar = 1 cm)
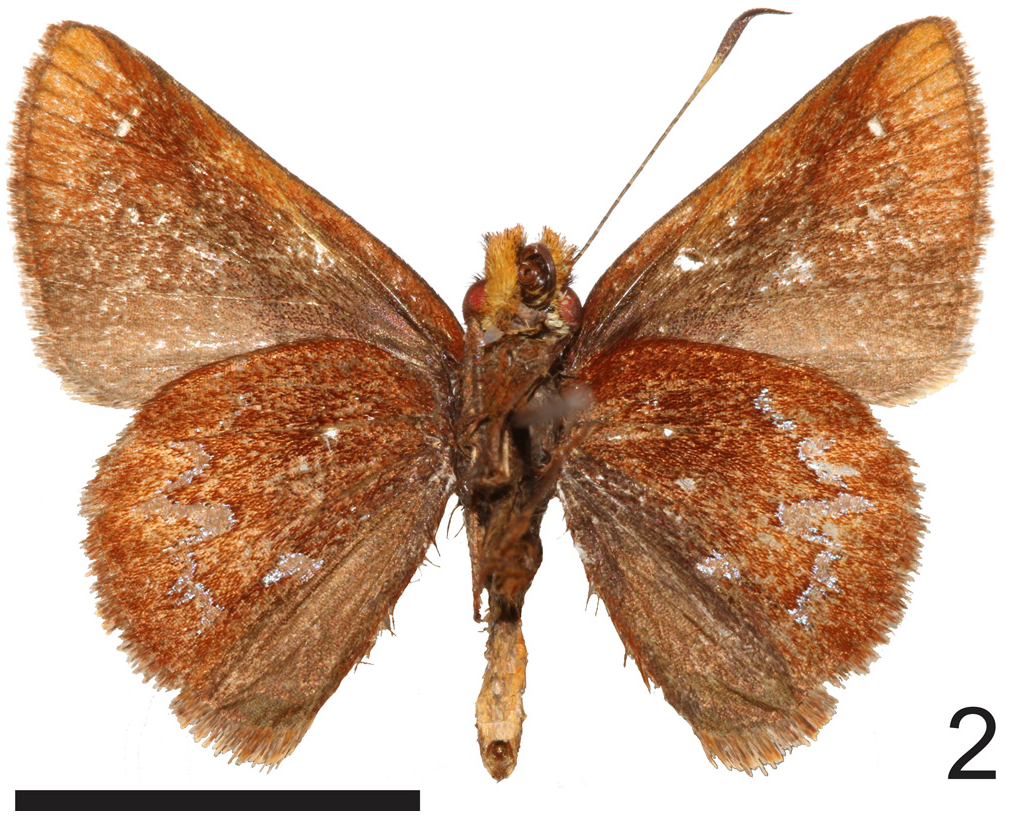
- Ventral view of male holotype (bar = 1 cm)

Scientific classification
- Kingdom: Animalia
- Phylum: Arthropoda
- Class: Insecta
- Order: Lepidoptera
- Family: Hesperiidae
- Genus: Wahydra
- Species: W. graslieae

Binomial name
- Wahydra graslieae A. Warren, Carneiro, & Dolibaina, 2018

= Wahydra graslieae =

Species of butterfly

Wahydra graslieae is a butterfly species in the family Hesperiidae. It is known from a single holotype specimen found in the Andes Mountains in Ecuador. The specific epithet honors the artist and science communicator Emily Graslie.

== Description ==
W. graslieae is about the size of a postage stamp. In this obscure genus, W. graslieae is much darker than other described Wahydra species and with pointer forewings and metallic silver scales that have previously only been found in very distantly related skippers.
