= Emma Mills =

American author and YouTuber

- Born: March 20, 1989 (age 37)
- Education: Webster University; Indiana University School of Medicine
- Occupation: Writer
- Writing career
- Genre: Young adult
- Website: emmamillsbooks.com

Emma Mills (born March 20, 1989) is an American writer of young adult romance novels, scientist, and YouTuber.

== Biography ==
Mills first started writing her debut novel First & Then in high school. She completed the book in college. She graduated from Webster University with a Bachelor of Science in biology in 2012. She entered doctoral work through the Indiana BioMedical Gateway (IBMG) and in 2019 earned a Ph.D. in Anatomy and Cell Biology from Indiana University School of Medicine.

She started the YouTube channel "How To Adult" with fellow YA author T. Michael Martin. In 2017, they sold the channel to John and Hank Green's online video company, Complexly.

== Personal life ==
Mills lives in St. Louis, Missouri. Mills vlogs on her YouTube channel, Elmify.

== Works ==
It took her two years to sell her first published novel, First & Then. She has stated that This Adventure Ends was partially inspired by The Mixed Up Files of Mrs. Basil E. Frankweiler by E.L. Konigsburg.

First & Then and Lucky Caller received starred reviews from Kirkus Reviews. Lucky Caller and Foolish Hearts received starred reviews from Publishers Weekly.

Kirkus wrote in the review of Lucky Caller: "Mills [...] truly excels at creating vivid characters that will tear at readers’ heartstrings." Publishers Weekly wrote that Mills "delivers a well-crafted, bittersweet comedy of errors filled with realistically flawed characters and taut, witty dialogue."

=== Books ===
- Something Close to Magic. Atheneum Books, 2023.
- Lucky Caller. Henry Holt, 2020.
- Famous in a Small Town. Henry Holt, 2019.
- Foolish Hearts. Henry Holt, 2017.
- This Adventure Ends. Henry Holt, 2016.
- First & Then. Henry Holt, 2015.
