= Hayworth Theatre =

Los Angeles Historic-Cultural Monument

Coordinates: 34.060247°N 118.2808554°W

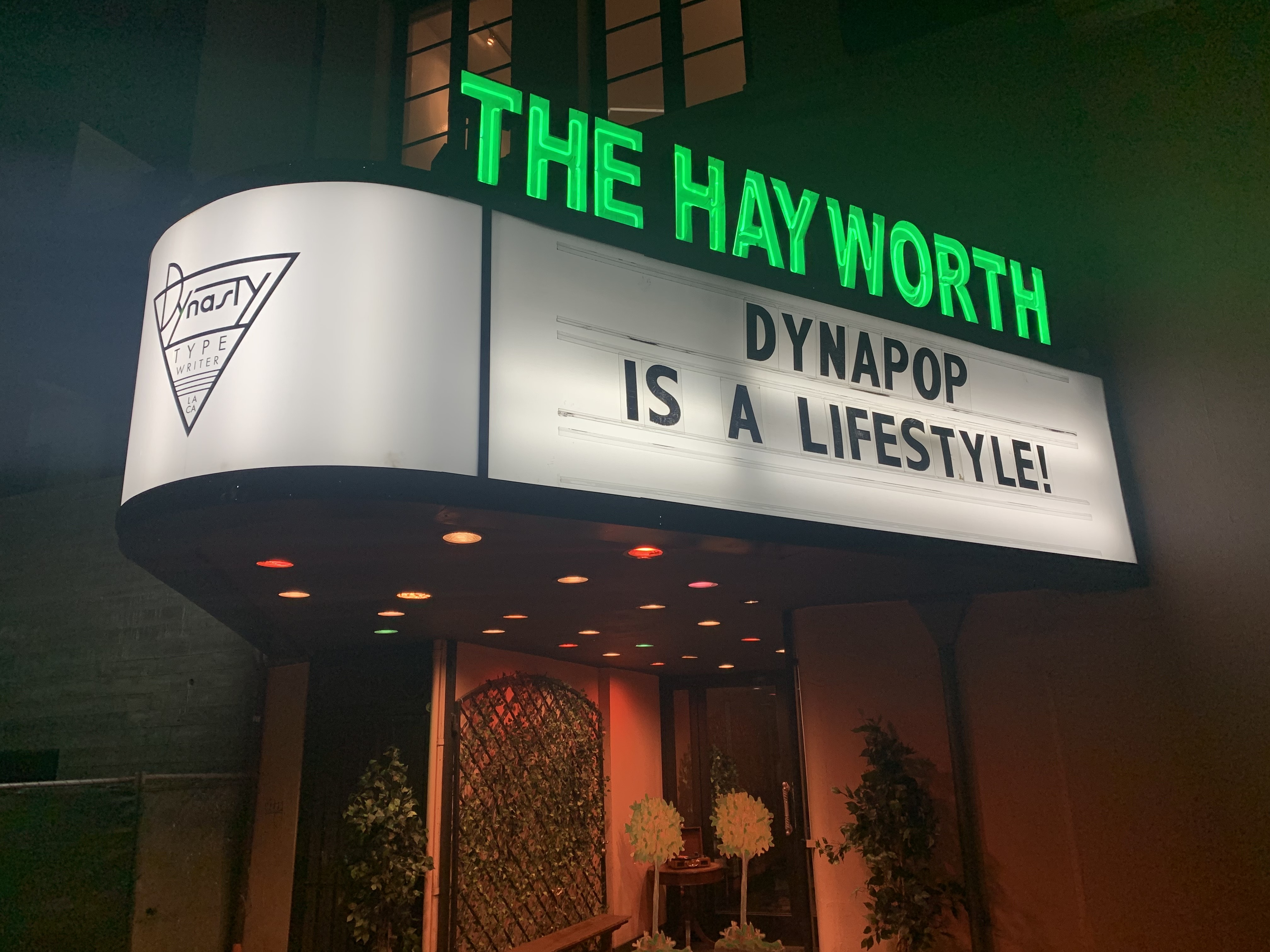
- Marquee of the Hayworth Theatre in 2021
- Formation: 1926
- Location: 2511 Wilshire Boulevard, Los Angeles, California
- Owner: Jenji Kohan
- Artistic Directors: Vanessa Ragland & Jamie Flam

The Hayworth Theatre, also known as the Dynasty Typewriter, is a theater and performing arts venue in Westlake neighborhood of Los Angeles, California. It was built in 1926 in Spanish style architecture and is at 2511 Wilshire Boulevard.

== History ==
The building is association with Stiles O. Clements of the architectural firm Morgan, Walls & Clements, who designed many other Los Angeles theatres as well as many of the buildings in the Wilshire historical district. The structure is in the Spanish Colonial Revival style, also called the ornate Churrigueresque style.

It originally opened in 1926 as The Masque Theatre, a Vaudeville House.

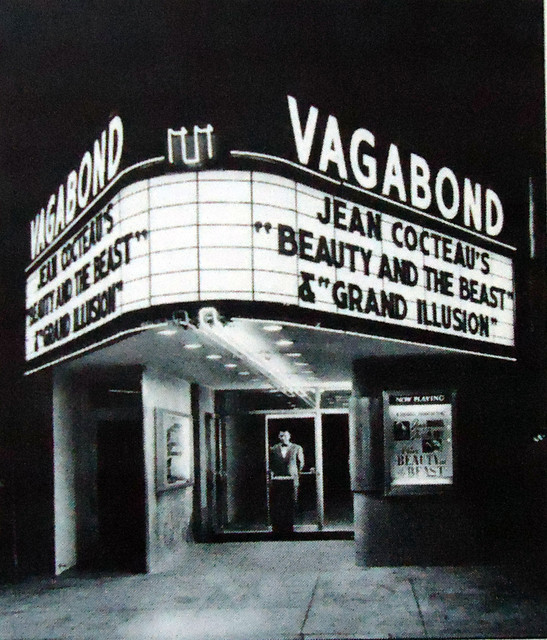
Vagabond Theatre

On May 26, 1950, it was converted into a movie theater, and rebranded as the Vagabond Theatre. Architect Dwight Gibbs, a designer of the Carthay Circle Theatre, was responsible for the transformation. The interior walls of the theatre were once adorned with murals depicting scenes from silent films. The building also housed a restaurant called Vagabond's House, which was possibly Los Angeles' first Tiki bar.

During its peak, it was one of the city's most popular revival houses, but the advent of video almost led to its downfall in the late 1980s. The theater managed to remain open into the 1990s, showing classic 3-D films like "Kiss Me Kate" and "Dial M for Murder."

The Hayworth Theatre Company became resident in 2006.The theatre housed theater company The New American Theatre from 2006 to 2011. Artistic Director and actor Jack Stehlin performed there, as well as other notable actors such as Alfred Molina, Katie Lowes, Jill Gascoine, and Robert Cicchini.

TV writer Jenji Kohan purchased the building in November 2013. Her husband and business partner, Christopher Noxon, indicated that she is planning on using the second floor as production offices for writers and editors on her TV shows. In 2015 the building was renovated by architect Linda Brettler and associate Lydia Dubois-Wetherwax to become production and writing offices maintaining the historical elements of the original building. Two years later they renovated the theater space.

In 2017, Jamie Flam and Vanessa Ragland launched a Kickstarter campaign to reopen the venue under the name Dynasty Typewriter. The two leased the venue together, and operate it as a hub for comedy, variety, screenings, and more, the new venue launched in January 2018 and has since hosted a multitude of shows and events, including notable performances by comedians Hannah Gadsby, Adam Sandler, Ilana Glazer, Patton Oswalt, and Margaret Cho.

== Film location ==
Throughout its history, the venue has been used as a location for a number of significant film + television productions:

- The Naked Gun: From the Files of Police Squad!, 1988 comedy starring Leslie Nielsen and Priscilla Presley.
- The Formula, 1980 mystery starring George C. Scott and Marlon Brando.
- La La Land, 2016 musical comedy starring Ryan Gosling and Emma Stone.
- Too Late, 2021 comedy starring Ron Lynch and Fred Armisen.

== Comedy specials and notable events ==
Under the Dynasty Typewriter tenure, the venue has been utilized as a filming location for a significant number of comedy specials from various production companies and networks, Netflix, Comedy Central, HBO, Peacock, Dropout and more.

- Adam Sandler: 100% Fresh
- Chris Fleming: Hell
- Esther Povitsky: Hot for My Name
- Eddie Pepitone: For the Masses
- Hank Green: Pissing Out Cancer
- Mark Normand: Out To Lunch
