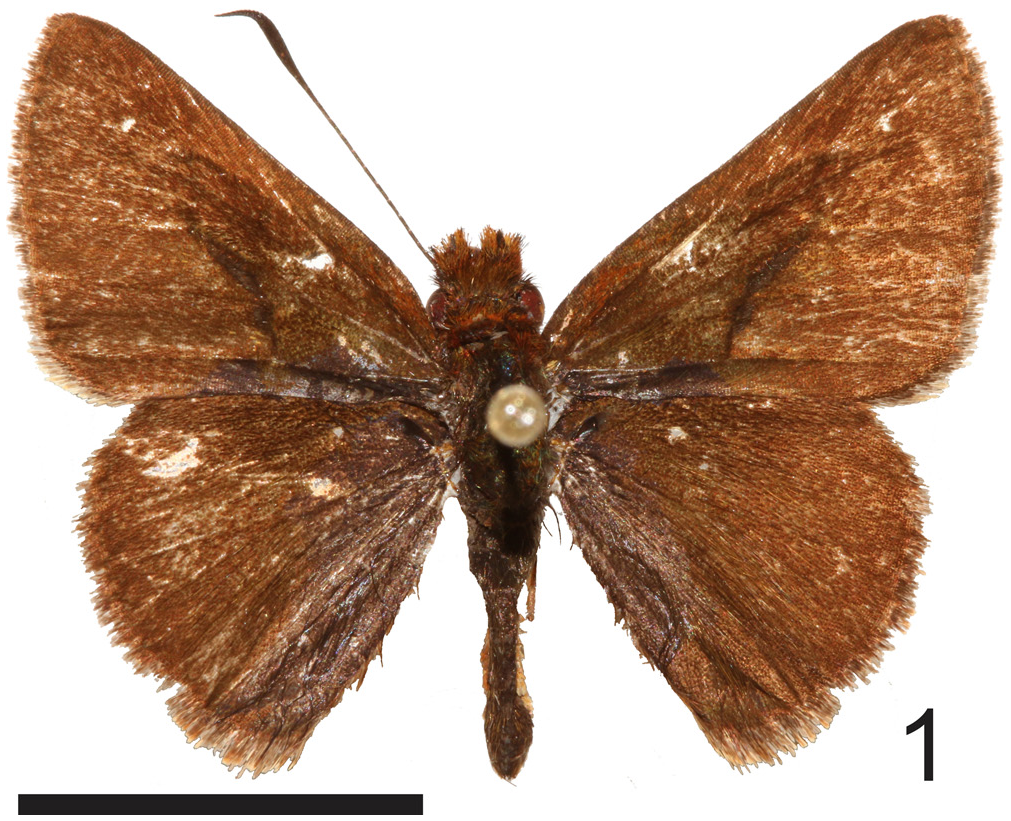
- Wahydra graslieae

Scientific classification
- Kingdom: Animalia
- Phylum: Arthropoda
- Class: Insecta
- Order: Lepidoptera
- Family: Hesperiidae
- Subtribe: Moncina
- Genus: Wahydra; Steinhauser, 1991

Type species
- Pamphila kenava Butler, 1870

= Wahydra =

Genus of butterflies

Wahydra is a genus of skippers in the family Hesperiidae. As of 2018 it consists of 15 species, including:

- Wahydra graslieae A. Warren, Carneiro & Dolibaina, 2018
- Wahydra kenava (Butler, 1870)
