= T. Michael Martin =

American writer

- Born: May 1984 (age 42)
- Education: University of North Carolina School of the Arts School of Filmmaking
- Occupations: Author, YouTube creator, host
- Writing career
- Genres: Young adult fiction, thriller
- Website: tmichaelmartin.com No Longer Functions

T. Michael Martin (born May, 1984) is best known for his work as an American author of Young Adult fiction and as a YouTube creator and host. His debut novel, a YA thriller called The End Games, was released in May 2013. The End Games received critical praise from, among others, Voice of Youth Advocates magazine, who called it "a tale of terror worthy of the early, great Stephen King." It was also chosen by John Green as the best YA novel of Summer 2013, was named Booklist’s Top Youth Horror Novel of 2013, and earned Martin the top spot on Booklist’s "Insanely Talented First Novelists" list.

Martin is also a YouTube vlogger, a YouTube Content Strategist employed at Google, and the co-creator and former showrunner and co-host of "How to Adult," a YouTube educational channel produced by Vlogbrothers Hank and John Green.

== Biography ==
Raised in Bridgeport, West Virginia, Martin graduated in 2007 from the University of North Carolina School of the Arts School of Filmmaking, with the highest GPA in the school's history. He was inspired to write The End Games by his brother, Patrick, and their mutual love of zombie films.

From 2013 to 2016, Martin lived in Indianapolis to produce the YouTube channel “How to Adult” along with the channel's co-creator, Emma Mills. The pair sold the show and channel to John and Hank Green's online video company, Complexly, in 2017.

Martin currently resides in Los Angeles, where he is employed by Google as the Global YouTube Learning, Family, & Social Impact Content Strategist. As of October 2018, Martin has also begun work on his first thriller for adults, “as a hobby,” tentatively titled No Music in the Nightingale.

== Works ==
- The End Games (Balzer + Bray, imprint of HarperCollins, May 2013)
- Mr. Fahrenheit (Balzer + Bray, imprint of HarperCollins, April 19, 2016)

== Reception ==
In a starred review Booklist writes that The End Games is "a glimmer of postapocalyptic hope" and "the best of the undead bunch," praising its "relentless action, intelligence, and emotion.". VOYA, in a glowing review, calls it "a dynamo of a debut novel," "a tale of terror worthy of the early, great Stephen King." Booklist also named it Top Youth Horror Novel of 2013 and Martin its #1 "Insanely Talented First Novelists of 2013." John Green chose The End Games as the best YA novel of Summer 2013 and calls it "the zombie book I wish I could've written."

Mr. Fahrenheit likewise won critical plaudits, including a starred review from Booklist, which called the novel “Bradburian magic. This is The Day the Earth Stood Still by way of Something Wicked This Way Comes: campy but haunting, and about ray-gun-shooting monsters as much as it is about bittersweet broken dreams.” New York Times bestselling author Hank Green also praised the novel, stating, “[I]t’s wonderful. I love me some good alien stories! Action packed!”
