= The Green Guide =

American lifestyle publication and website

The Green Guide was a bi-monthly publication produced by the National Geographic Society as an information resource on eco-conscious and healthy living. Founded in 1994, it ceased publication in 2008, and now exists as a website only. The quarterly National Geographic Green Guide magazine was an evolution of the pre-existing Green Guide Web site and bimonthly newsletter, founded in 1994 by former Natural Resources Defense Council staff scientist Wendy Gordon.

== History and profile ==
The Green Guide was started in 1994. The magazine launched website in 2002. The National Geographic Society bought the magazine in March 2007. It was relaunched by the company as a general consumer quarterly in March 2007. The magazine was cut down with its March 4, 2008 issue to a quarterly publication. It ceased publication in late 2008.

It was printed sustainably on Verso Paper with FSC Mixed Source Label, meaning the wood comes from Forest Stewardship Council-certified, well-managed forests, sources controlled in accordance with FSC standards, and/or recycled material. In addition to the traditional printed publication, The National Geographic Green Guide was available as a digital subscription using Texterity’s Web publishing format.
