= Lindsey Doe =

Sexologist and YouTuber (born 1981)

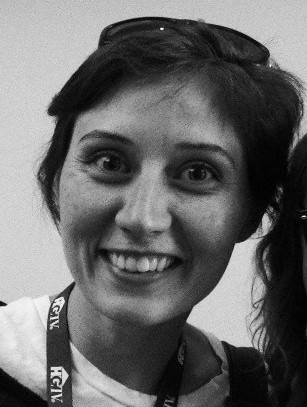
- Doe (photographed June 27, 2014)
- Born: 1981 (age 44–45)
- Education: MS, U. of Montana (2005); PhD, Inst. for Advanced Study of Human Sexuality
- Occupations: Adjunct professor; sexologist
- Employer: U. of Montana (2006–2014)

Lindsey Takara Doe (born 1981) is a Japanese-American sexologist, sex educator, and host of Sexplanations on YouTube and Nebula.

== Personal life ==
Lindsey Takara Doe was born in 1981. Doe is Japanese-American; her middle name means "treasure" in Japanese. As of January 2017, she had three children.

In 2010, Doe's photograph was featured alongside a personal statement as part of The Strong Women Project, exhibited at the Maureen and Mike Mansfield Library in Missoula, Montana. She was originally photographed "in a pressed collared shirt, slacks and matching jewelry", but felt she was misrepresenting herself; Doe returned to the shoot hours later, stripped to her underwear, and slathered herself in homemade mud to retake the photos.

In 2015, when one of her daughters complained about a boy who would not stop pestering her for a date, Doe published a video addressing such harassment from boys; the video received international attention, spirited debate, and over 76,000 views in ten days.

In 2022, Doe posted to Twitter that she had moved to Slovenia.

== Education ==
For her Master of Science at the University of Montana (UM) in 2005, Doe's thesis was Phenomenological claim of first sexual intercourse among individuals of varied levels of sexual self-disclosure. She received her Doctor of Philosophy in human sexuality from the then-accredited Institute for Advanced Study of Human Sexuality.

== Career ==
A self-described sexologist, by February 2008, Doe had an office in Missoula—the city's first that specifically helped clients with sexuality-related difficulties. In 2015, her sexual health center was Birds and Bees LLC.

She was also an adjunct professor at UM, teaching on human sexuality, from 2006–2014. After her departure from the school due to budget cuts, enrollment numbers in the human-sexuality course dropped by half, and by the 2017–2018 academic year, the course was gone altogether. In autumn 2014, she was traveling across the United States and giving one-hour college lectures on sexual health.

=== Sexplanations ===
Sexplanations
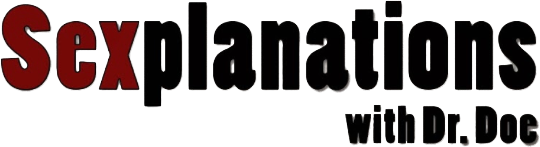

YouTube information
- Channel: Sexplanations
- Years active: 2013–2021; 2023–present
- Genre: Human sexuality
- Subscribers: 1.13 million
- Views: 266 million
- Last updated: October 2025

Driven by her children's lack of sex education, in April 2013, Doe partnered with Hank Green to found the YouTube channel Sexplanations, a series about human sexuality that began that July. By October 2013, the videos had already attracted controversy and attacks on its host; viewers have objected to Doe's use of the phrases "biosex male" and "biosex female" to refer to sex assignment, as well as her inclusion of "allies" in the initialism LGBTIQQAA2. The ratio of filmed content to the final videos is about 30:1, with Doe and her videographer agonizing over all the details. Guests on Sexplanations have included Green and Eden Atwood. The show's tagline is "stay curious". In 2015, The Daily Dot raved about Sexplanations, calling it "not only an accomplishment in the world of sex education but the world of YouTube." In June 2017, Doe expanded the Sexplanations brand to a similarly-themed podcast. The February 27, 2019 YouTube episode of Sexplanations was the last to credit Green as an executive producer.

In November 2021, Doe announced the December retirement of Sexplanations, citing two primary reasons: first, an observation that she was finding her content repetitive, and second, that her mental health had declined from nearly a decade of persistent sexual harassment and vitriolic emails and calls to her personal cell phone. In February 2023, Doe resumed uploading videos to the channel.

In September 2024, the far-right social media brand Libs of TikTok shared a clip of an April 2021 Sexplanations video in which Doe defined pedophilia as a sexual orientation and paraphilia, discussed a support group for pedophiles who chose not to act on their sexual attraction to children (Virtuous Pedophiles), and stated that she believed all pedophiles should be treated without judgment. Doe posted a response video in November 2024, in which she said the comments section of the 2021 video was inundated with threats and harassment (approximately 21,000 hostile comments in total) following the Libs of TikTok post and that the video, itself, was eventually removed by YouTube for allegedly violating the platform's terms of service. Doe also said that the clip (as well as Libs of TikTok's brief summation of it) accurately reflected her beliefs. Doe elaborated, "Shame inhibits people from seeking help and increases the risk of abuse." In a February 2025 video, Doe said that the 2021 piece (along with others that had been involuntarily removed by YouTube) was available via Patreon and Nebula. In a December 2025 video, Doe said she had been approached outside a national park while on a Sexplanations RV tour the previous summer by someone who told her, "I heard you support pedophiles." She said she explained her position to that person and believed the right-wing smear tactic of falsely attempting to associate someone with pedophilia or sexual grooming was being used against her.

== Views ==
=== Circumcision ===
Doe opposes routine neonatal circumcision and considers the surgery a "sexual injustice" when performed on nonconsenting parties for non-medical reasons. She also believes routine circumcision harms patients and their sexual partners. She has said she was first educated on the topic as a college student, when she was shown the 1995 anti-circumcision documentary Whose Body, Whose Rights?, an experience that "changed [her] life." In a March 2020 Sexplanations video, Doe declared the foreskin her favorite part of the human penis.

=== Homeopathy ===
In an October 2013 Sexplanations video, Doe mentioned the existence of "naturopathic and homeopathic" herpes simplex remedies. In a video posted the following month, she defended her decision to discuss homeopathy (a discredited form of alternative medicine), stating, "I like to give people choices." Doe presented a Hyland's cold sore remedy as an example of homeopathic treatment and claimed, "Two Nobel Peace Prize winners, a professor of [sic] emeritus at Cambridge University, the National Institutes of Health, WebMD, my local grocery store, and the Food and Drug Administration do not discount homeopathy."

=== Sex offender registries ===
In an August 2021 Sexplanations video, Doe said she believed American sex offender registries caused more harm than they prevented. She stated that registries created a false sense of security amongst the public and led to increased recidivism (due to stigma, as well as barriers to social supports, stable housing, and employment). She also stated that registries diverted public resources from prevention and offender/survivor recovery, discouraged the reporting of crimes (particularly by those living with or closely related to an offender), and discouraged offenders from seeking treatment. Doe suggested offense-based registries be replaced by risk-based ones, specially trained therapists or counselors be the ones to determine risk and design recovery plans, and stigmatizing language be avoided.
