= Emily Graslie =

American science communicator and YouTube educator

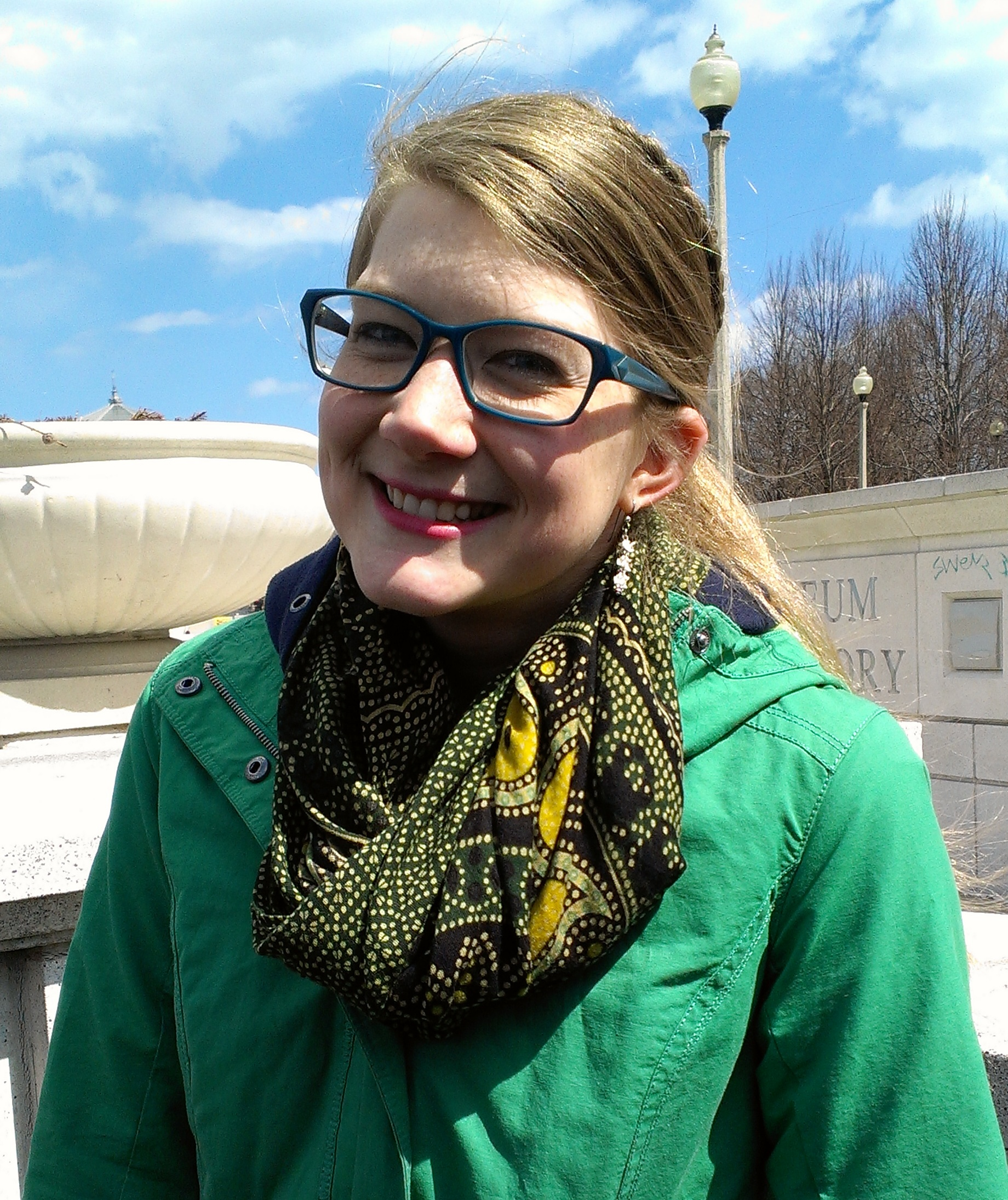
- Graslie in April 2013
- Born: 1989 (age 36–37); Rapid City, South Dakota, U.S.
- Education: Bachelor's Degree in Studio Art from University of Montana
- Occupation: Chief Curiosity Correspondent at the Field Museum (former)

Emily Graslie (born 1989) is an American science communicator and YouTube educator. She started volunteering at the Philip L. Wright Zoological Museum at the University of Montana in 2011. After appearing in a VlogBrothers video by Hank Green in 2012, she was asked to join the Nerdfighter network. She presented the educational YouTube channel called "The Brain Scoop" until 2021 and also hosted portions of the Big History series featured on the Crash Course YouTube channel. Graslie was employed by the Field Museum as their first-ever chief curiosity correspondent.

== Early life and education ==
Graslie earned her bachelor's degree in Studio Art from the University of Montana in 2011. As a part of that program, she interned at the Philip L. Wright Zoological Museum in her senior year. Graslie became a full-time curatorial volunteer after she graduated, while working on her master's degree in museum studies. She cleaned new specimens, gave tours, trained new interns, and acted as a teaching assistant for a class at the University of Montana.

== Career ==
In June 2013, Graslie was hired by Chicago's Field Museum of Natural History as their chief curiosity correspondent. She continued to host "The Brain Scoop" from this new location. She was the keynote speaker at the Chicago March for Science on April 22, 2017. In 2019, the Graslie Curiosity Internship was named in her honor. In 2021, she received an honorary doctorate of humane letters from Allegheny College.

=== YouTube ===
Graslie first appeared on YouTube in Hank Green's December 7, 2012, VlogBrothers video. In the video, she showed Green a wide variety of the specimens in the lab. Because of her ease in front of the camera, enthusiasm, and fan comments, Graslie was asked to create her own YouTube channel, "The Brain Scoop", as a part of the Nerdfighter family. The series debuted in January 2013. Her work on the series has been described by journalists as "articulate and hilarious" as well as enthusiastic.

Her November 27, 2013, video, which addressed the situation of women in STEM fields and inappropriate comments she received on her own postings, received a high level of media attention. In January 2014, Amy Wallace, another science journalist, wrote an article about how science journalists can find themselves the target of ugly personal attacks, and the attacks on female journalists include criticisms of their sexual attractiveness, and their sexual morality. Wallace included Graslie when she listed half a dozen fellow female science journalists whose reasonable, science-based articles on controversial topics had triggered crude abusive backlashes.

In 2014, her channel "The Brain Scoop" was listed on New Media Rockstars Top 100 Channels, ranked at #96.

In 2016, she documented the efforts to help the recovery of the Kankakee mallow, an endangered species that is endemic to Illinois. As the only floral species that is found exclusively in that state, she has started an effort to make it the official Illinois state flower, proposing that it replace the more generic Viola sororia.

She left the channel and the Field Museum at the end of 2020. She then started her own channel and began releasing a series titled "Art Lab", focusing on the intersection between science and art.

In June 2023, Graslie revealed that she had been diagnosed with bipolar disorder in late 2020, around the same time she left the Field Museum. She clarified that she was "not ashamed of this" and that "part of the reason I'm sharing now is that I'm personally ready to start publicly educating and fighting the stigma against this often debilitating disorder." In July 2024, when musician Rob Scallon revealed his own bipolar 1 disorder diagnosis, he credited Graslie as a support during his struggles.

In November 2023, Graslie announced that she had brought the rights to The Brain Scoop under her personal control, and would soon be relaunching the channel as an independent production.

=== Prehistoric Road Trip ===
In May 2019, Graslie announced that she would be producing and hosting a 3-hour series, on paleontology in the American Midwest, for PBS and WTTW; filming took place throughout 2019. Its title, Prehistoric Road Trip, and a summer 2020 airdate were announced in July 2019. The episodes aired June 17-July 1, 2020.

=== National Institutes of Health ===
In 2024, Graslie began a project with the National Institutes of Health to "create videos sharing and demystifying work from the largest medical research organization in the world." In January 2025, she received an email telling her that the project was on hold until further notice. Graslie has stated that she has not been compensated for any of the preproduction work she did in 2024.

== Species named in Graslie's honor ==
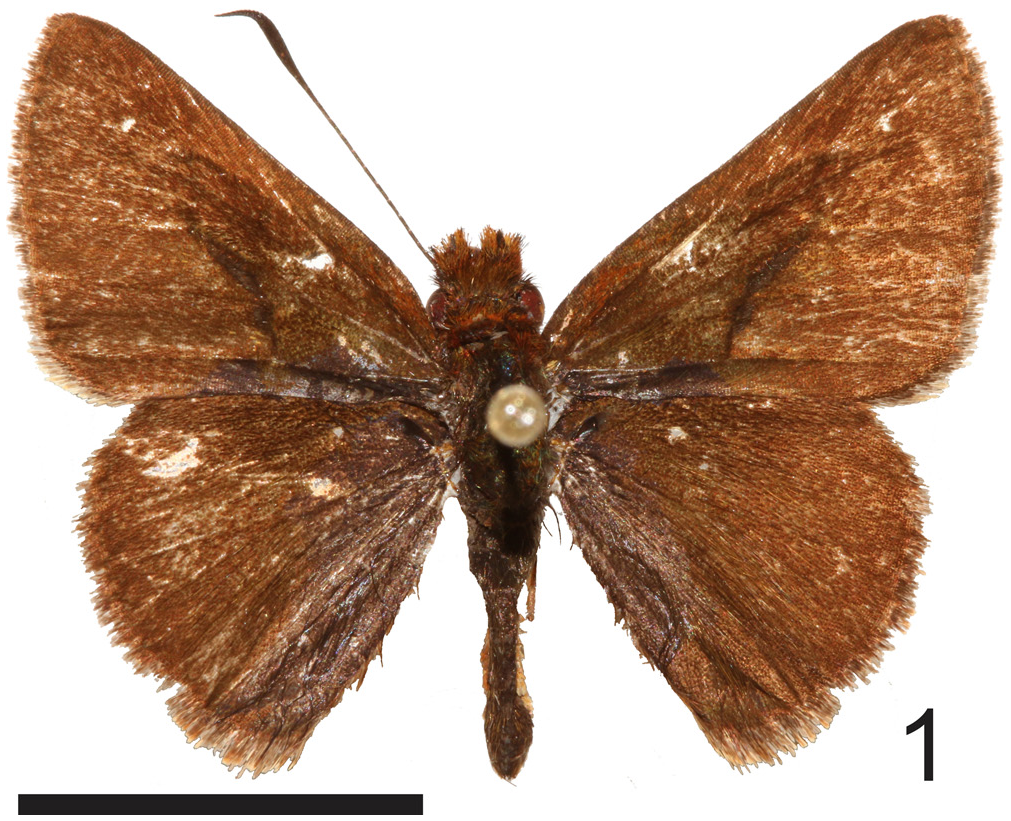
Holotype specimen of Wahydra graslieae, named in Graslie's honor

In recognition of her science education efforts, a butterfly species, Wahydra graslieae, was named in her honor. The species is a grass skipper discovered in Ecuador.

Andy Warren, senior collections manager of the Florida Museum of Natural History's McGuire Center for Lepidoptera and Biodiversity, said "We thought that after spending years explaining why specimens are important and bringing natural history collections to the attention of the public, Emily was definitely someone who should have a bug named after her."
