= Omegaverse =

Genre of speculative erotic fiction

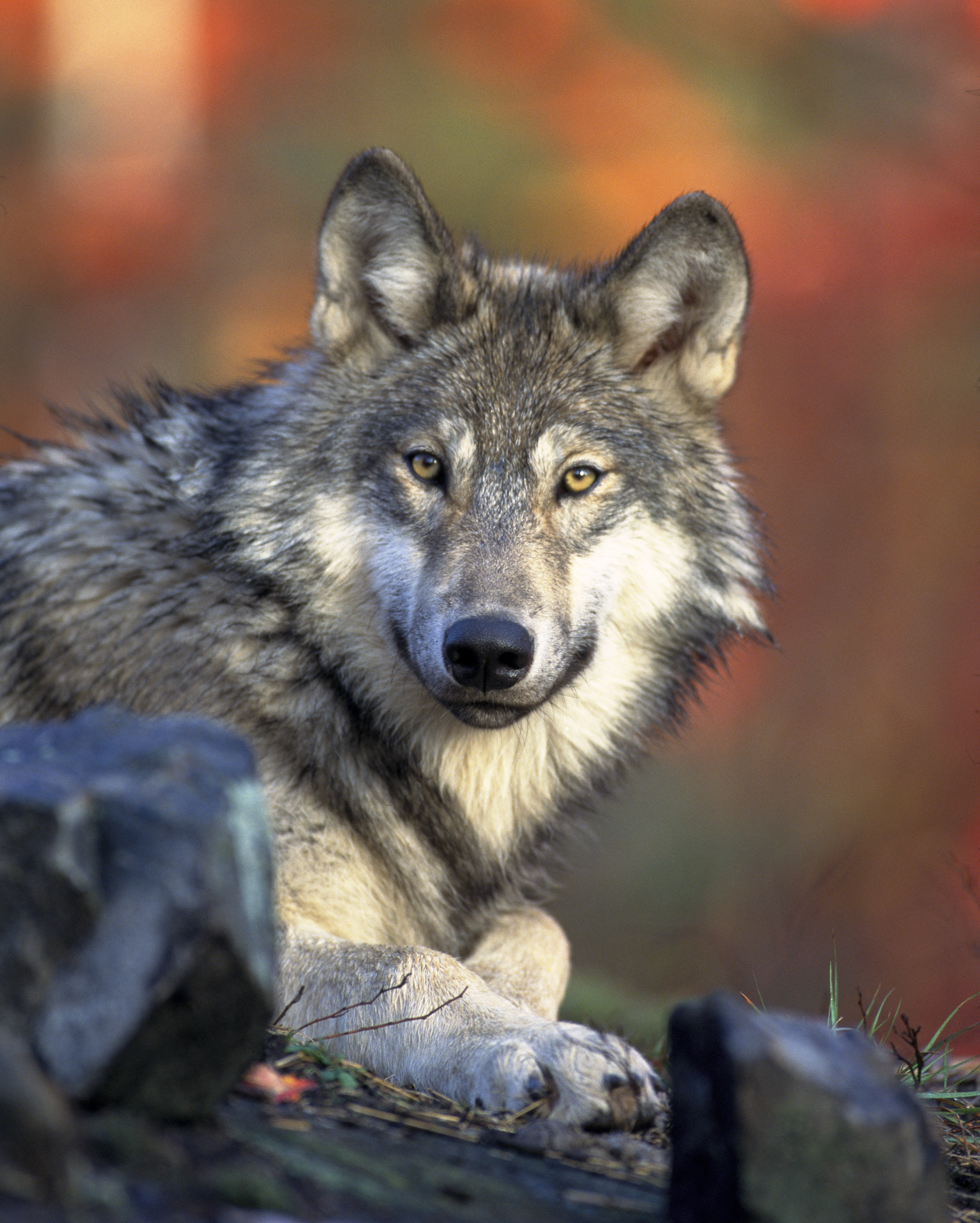
Omegaverse supposes the existence of a dominance hierarchy among humans, similar to wolves and other canids in fiction.

Omegaverse, also known as A/B/O or α/β/Ω (an abbreviation for "alpha/beta/omega"), is a subgenre of speculative erotic fiction.

The genre supposes the existence of a dominance hierarchy among humans as similar to that associated in popular myth with wolves and other canids that is composed of dominant "alphas", neutral "betas", and submissive "omegas". In the Omegaverse, this hierarchy determines how people interact with one another in romantic, erotic and sexual contexts.

Though tropes associated with Omegaverse can be observed in works published as early as the 1960s, the genre formally originated in the 2010s as a subgenre of erotic slash (same-sex) fan fiction, as a fusion of elements of werewolf fiction and the mpreg subgenre.

== Genre characteristics ==
Works in the Omegaverse genre typically depict characters as possessing two sexes: a primary sex (male or female) determined by their external sexual organs, and a secondary sex that manifests during puberty, determined by their internal reproductive system. The secondary sex is typically one of the following, each of which also corresponds to certain distinctive character traits:

- Alpha (α): socially (and in some interpretations, even biologically) dominant, physically built, short-tempered and a natural leader;
- Beta (β): either a regular human being, or has a mix of Alpha and Omega traits, or their unique traits;
- Omega (Ω): submissive and gentle, calm and a peacemaker and can get pregnant regardless of their gender

Characters typically possess wolf or other canid-like behavior, especially as it pertains to sexual intercourse and sexuality, which is described as instinctual, responding to animalistic physiological stimuli. This includes rutting and heat cycles, pheromonal attraction between Alphas and Omegas, penises with knots (used to "knot", or tie, the partner to an Alpha during copulation, an action known as "knotting"), scent marking, imprinting, breeding, mating rites, pack structures and potentially permanent psychic bonds with a mate. Between Alphas and Betas, only females can carry on a pregnancy, but male Omegas are often envisaged as being able to become pregnant via a uterus connected to the rectum, and Alphas can impregnate regardless of their main gender. To make penetration and impregnation easier, male Omegas often have self-lubricating anuses.

The abstract premises of Omegaverse could designate it as a fantasy genre according to the conventions established by Tzvetan Todorov, but the high specification of its characteristic elements suggests that it could also be considered a literary genre in itself. As Omegaverse is a type of folksonomy, some of its aspects are included or excluded at the discretion of the story author. Sometimes, Betas are absent, or other intermediate designations such as Deltas and Gammas are added.

The genre often features other fantasy elements, such as the presence of werewolves or other fantastical creatures. Some works introduce a rigid caste system, where Alphas are depicted as the upper class elites while Omegas are at the bottom tier and face discrimination and oppression because of their physiology, creating an example of biological determinism. In darker stories, this results in non-consensual or dubiously consensual intercourse, forced pregnancies, kidnapping of Omegas and sexual slavery.

Omegaverse works are most frequently focused on male-male couples composed of an Alpha and an Omega, though heterosexual Omegaverse works have been produced, and in 2013, about 10% of the Omegaverse works on fan fiction website Archive of Our Own (AO3) were labeled male/female. Some subvert the genre tropes, telling stories about illicit relationships between Alphas, Omegas who hide their smell using chemical pheromones so that they are not a victim of biological prejudices, or dominant Omegas and submissive Alphas. Non-traditional couples are often featured in Japanese Omegaverse works.

While the terms "A/B/O" and "Omegaverse" can be used interchangeably, the first one often refers only to the sexual dynamics, while the second one is preferred when the story is set in a new ideological world. Some prefer to avoid use of the term "A/B/O" because it resembles the racial slur abo.

== History ==
=== Tropes origins ===
The tropes commonly associated with the genre are not exclusive to it: they can be found across fandoms of various media, but came together in the Omegaverse in what Professor Kristina Busse has described as "a seemingly perfect storm". The concept of mating and heat cycles among humans was popularized by the 1967 episode "Amok Time" of the American television series Star Trek, which introduces the concept of pon farr, the Vulcan mating cycle wherein Vulcan males must mate or die, which became a popular plot concept for fan works in the Star Trek fandom, particularly fan fiction focused on the Kirk/Spock pairing. Ursula K. Le Guin also wrote, in her 1969 novel The Left Hand of Darkness, about an extraterrestrial androgynous world with hermaphroditic characters and mating cycles named kemmer. Animal transformations like werewolves are included in Buffy the Vampire Slayer, Twilight, Teen Wolf, and Harry Potter, with the latter's fandom popularizing bestiality kinks.

=== Genre history ===
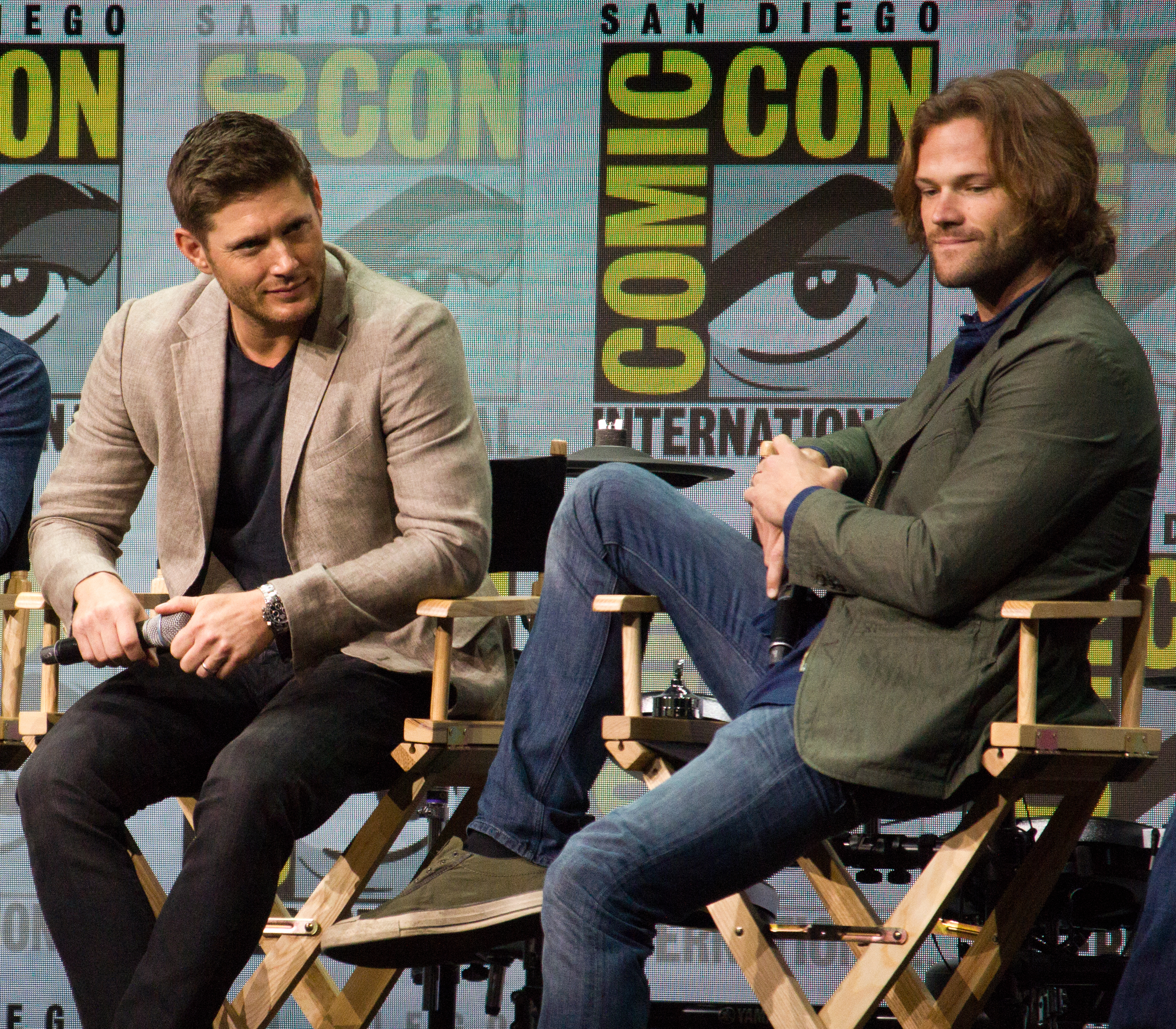
Early works of Omegaverse fan fiction featured Jensen Ackles and Jared Padalecki, actors who starred in Supernatural.

The origin of the Omegaverse is typically attributed to the fandom surrounding the American television series Supernatural, as a fusion between werewolves and the mpreg subgenre of erotic fan fiction. Another source of inspiration could have been the science fiction drama Dark Angel, in which Supernatural actor Jensen Ackles plays twin supersoldiers with feline DNA, and female characters of their species go into heat.

The first works recognized as A/B/O were published in mid-2010: that May, a writing prompt was shared on a LiveJournal community dedicated to Supernatural, mentioning "alpha" males having knots on their penises, and "bitch males" without the knots, inspiring user tehdirtiestsock to write I ain't no lady, but you'd be the tramp, a real person fiction work focused on actors Jared Padalecki and Jensen Ackles as an Alpha and an Omega, which was published on 24 July. Despite not using the term "omega", the story created many of the characteristics later associated with the Omegaverse genre.

Over the next few months, other anonymous authors shared similar stories, until on 9 November a new writing prompt mentioned Alpha, Beta and Omega men for the first time, spurring the creation of three works. By June 2011, the term "Omegaverse" and its dynamics had become commonplace; the following month, the first femslash Omegaverse work was published, and the first use of the tropes outside the Supernatural fandom was recorded.

The genre subsequently expanded in popularity to other fan communities: first to those focused around Sherlock and X-Men: First Class, then it quickly reached other fandoms like those of television series Hannibal, Teen Wolf, Glee, Doctor Who and the movie The Avengers. A Chinese translation of an A/B/O Sherlock fanfic posted on the website Suiyuanju around October 2011 introduced Omegaverse to Chinese slash fan circles, from which it spread to danmei original novels.

In 2012, the notion of "fated mates" was introduced. In 2014, Omegaverse gained strong traction in Japan, acquiring market value with the publication of the first A/B/O manga in 2015. In 2016 the discrimination and power dynamics between Alphas, Betas and Omegas began to be outlined, and the idea of the mark or bite that chemically and biologically links couples together was created, while in 2018 the concept of the "inner wolf", an animal instinct guiding Alphas and Omegas, arose. Through her work Kanraku Alpha Enigma, manga artist Shinshi Nakai subsequently tried to add the "Enigma", a new type of character who can mutate their secondary gender, but the novelty was resisted by Omegaverse fans and had no impact or continuity.

== Reception and analysis ==
Omegaverse has become both extremely popular and controversial in fandom circles. Some condemn it, claiming that it reinforces patriarchal values and a rape culture, objecting to its roots in bestiality fiction and the power imbalances between genders. Conversely, others appreciate how it deconstructs bodies and gender roles, offering subversive social commentary on queer identity and oppression.

Academic opinions are equally divided between those who believe Omegaverse shows a new type of gender essentialism combined with homophobic and heteronormative elements, and those who give it a transgender reading. Delgado Díaz, Ubillus Breña and Cappello do not believe that the Omegaverse is linked to queer theory or transidentity, despite containing allegories to gender identity and the female condition (Omegas, both male and female, could be considered embodiments of the traditional role of women as housewives and mothers), whose purpose, however, is only that of frameworks to plots ranging from melodrama to horror.

According to researcher Milena Popova, "the features of the A/B/O genre allow for the exploration of themes of power, desire, pleasure, intimacy, romance, control, and consent in a variety of ways", and it is used by writers and readers "as a tool to articulate and think through consent issues in unequal relationships". Similarly, Laura Campillo Arnaiz argues that dark Omegaverse works serve to gain control over the feelings of helplessness and humiliation that characterize it, creating a cathartic experience.

Academic Paige Hartenburg has suggested that the Omegaverse is connected to LGBTQ+ trauma and corrective narratives, saying that it "writes queerness through the impact it leaves on the body, with its violence and heteronormic tendencies responding to larger structures that attempt to confine narrative authority to a single group" and "in all its intricacies, both problematic in its highly patriarchal troupes [sic] and emblematic of considerable community trauma, [the Omegaverse] is a genre representative of the dissolving relationship between queer fandom spaces and mainstream creatives".

Angie Fazekas wrote that "[i]n the omegaverse, fans use traditional tropes of gender and sexuality to imagine a universe where queer sexuality is the norm and normative gender roles are often skewed and upended", but that they fail to offer real progressiveness since, like most of the other fan fictions, their works are predominantly focused on relationships between white men.

== Impact ==
The Omegaverse exploded in popularity in 2017, quickly becoming a frequent subject of fan fiction writers. As of July 2018, over 39,000 Omegaverse fan works had been published on AO3, and over 300,000 as of 2026.

In addition to these derivative works, Omegaverse has emerged as its own genre of original commercial erotic fiction: roughly 200 Omegaverse novels were published on Amazon from January to June 2020. It has also become a subgenre of both commercial and non-commercial yaoi (manga featuring male-male couples). Given the positive reception in Japan, South Korea started its own production of Omegaverse manhwas, as well as China, although the censorship applied in this latter country has limited the genre popularity.

Beginning in 2017, the "Dom/Sub Universe" subgenre gained popularity, particularly in yaoi works in Japan; it uses BDSM elements, positing dominant and submissive as secondary genders, and draws inspirations from Omegaverse in its depiction of caste systems.

== See also ==
- Alpha and beta male
