= Mpreg =

Male pregnancy in fiction

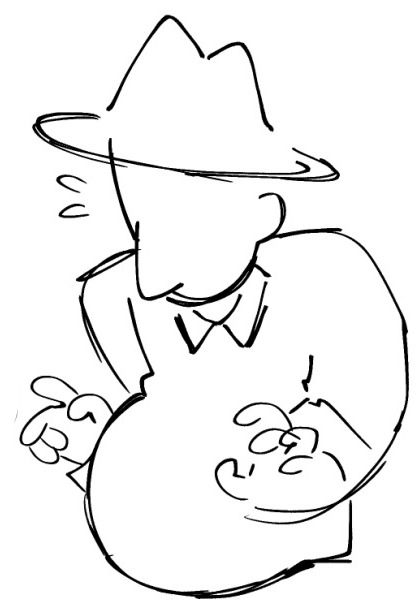
Mpreg fan art of Dad Egbert from Homestuck

Mpreg, short for male pregnancy, is a trope in fiction in which male characters become pregnant. The trope is most commonly found in fanfiction, for example in slash fiction, but has also appeared in published fiction.

== History ==
Male pregnancy has been explored in literature and popular culture since antiquity. In contemporary fiction, male pregnancy is often given a comedic or monstrous presentation. For instance, the 1994 comedy film Junior followed a man who agreed to become pregnant as part of a scientific experiment. Additionally, the Alien franchise frames male pregnancy as a form of body horror, with the design of the Xenomorph species and its life cycle symbolizing rape and pregnancy. Alexandre O. Philippe interprets the depiction of male rape and pregnancy in Alien as a manifestation of widespread unspoken, unconscious patriarchal guilt that existed in the 1970s.

The modern trope of mpreg originated in the 1980s, and became popular as an outgrowth of the Omegaverse in the Supernatural fandom in the 2000s and 2010s. While not all mpreg fiction is fanfiction, even original fiction mpreg has its roots in the fandom trope.

== Description ==
Mpreg fiction centers around the impregnation of a (typically cisgender) man by another man. Mpreg tends to present male pregnancy as a positive and sometimes even unsurprising fact. The mechanism of the pregnancy varies depending on the work, from one-off magical interventions to the biology of the Omegaverse. The birthing process also varies, including c-section, special "birth canals", and birth through the anus or penis. Within the community, anal birth is typically looked down upon, often derisively referred to as "ass baby" stories.

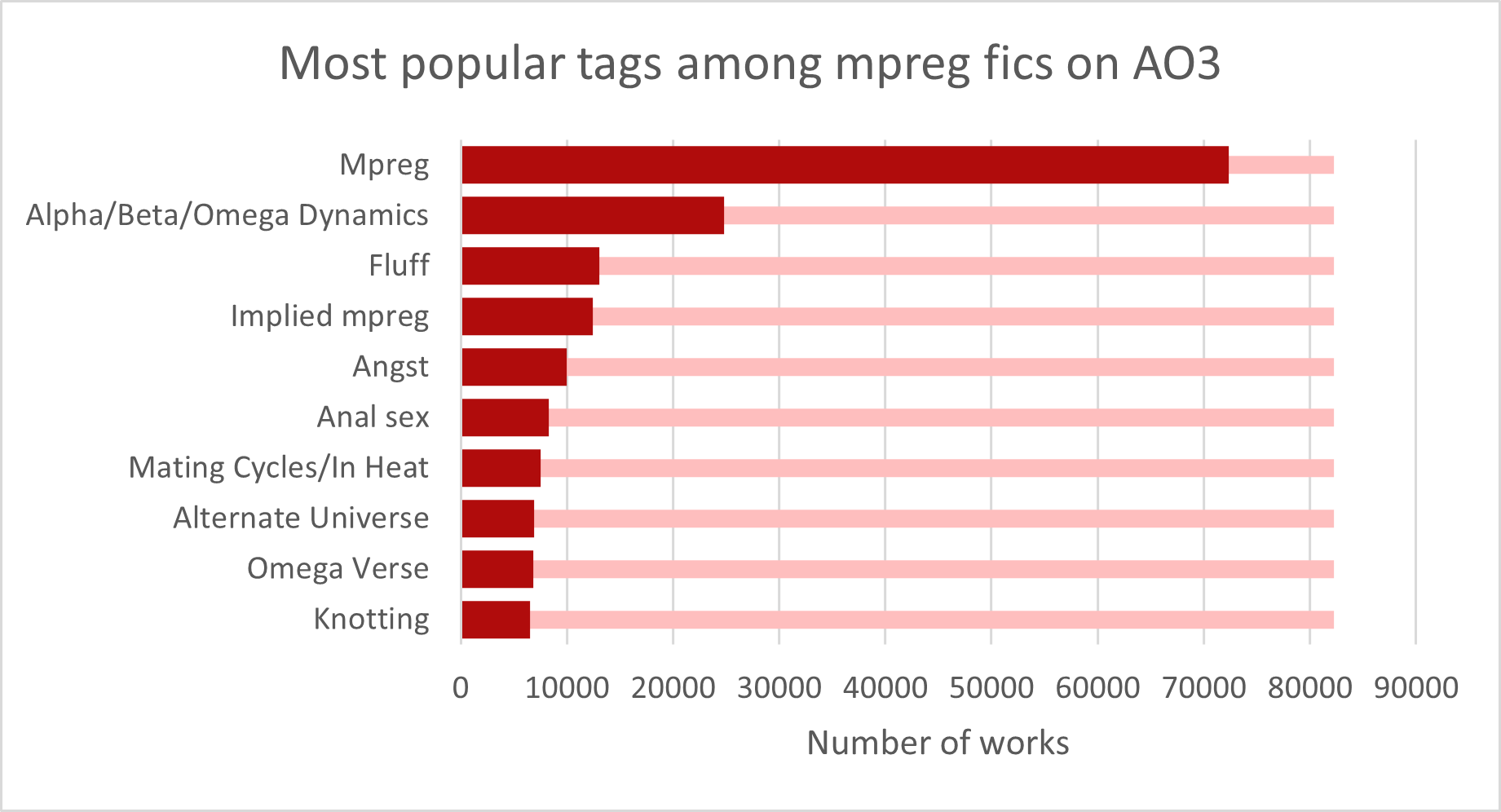
Most popular tags on mpreg fanfiction on Archive of Our Own, also known as AO3

While not necessarily sexual, the stories are often partially pornographic. However, they can often simply focus on the romantic relationship between the central couple. A survey of users of the primarily original fiction site "Mpreg Central" found that 57% preferred their stories to include sex, while 43% preferred it to be deemphasized or not included at all. Mpreg fiction can also focus on the experience of pregnancy itself, including morning sickness, mood swings, and cravings, or its impact on a relationship. Some mpreg does not focus on the pregnancy at all, choosing to write a romance in which a male pregnancy features but does not dominate the plot. Those authors may choose to focus on the domesticity of the couple or the romantic bond between them.

== Community ==
Most mpreg fiction is written and read by women. One original fiction author estimates that most of her audience is women in their 20s and above. Other mpreg communities, like the forum Mpreg Central, are predominately gay men. They often want to be pregnant themselves or impregnate another man. Reading and writing mpreg fiction is often stigmatized, including within the itself stigmatized world of slash fandom. One author described other fans as opposing mpreg because it "turns the male characters into whiny, feminized versions of themselves". Mpreg also features as a niche genre of video pornography.

== Scholarly reception ==
Within academia, Constance Penley was the first to write about mpreg in 1997, describing it as a subversive "extreme retooling of the male body". More recently, mpreg has both been criticized as reinforcing traditional gender roles and praised for subverting them. Berit Åström, in her analysis of mpreg fiction within the Supernatural fandom, describes some authors as pointedly asserting the character's masculinity, while others show the pregnant characters "expressing emotions stereotypically expected of women". Overall, she finds the stories "quite heteronormative", with "conventional stories set in a very unconventional universe". Some studies analyze the pregnant men in mpreg fiction as representations of women.

== See also ==
- Yaoi hole
- Sex and sexuality in speculative fiction
- LGBTQ themes in speculative fiction
- Reproduction and pregnancy in speculative fiction
- Impregnation fetishism
