= Fan studies =

Study of fandom, fan works, and their related communities

Fan studies is an academic discipline that analyses fans, fandoms, fan cultures and fan activities, including fanworks. It is an interdisciplinary field located at the intersection of the humanities and social sciences, which emerged in the early 1990s as a separate discipline, and draws particularly on audience studies and cultural studies.

== Definition and scope ==
Fan studies analyses fans, fandoms, fan cultures and fan activities, and provides a theoretical framework for investigating audience responses and fan-created works. It is an interdisciplinary field located at the intersection of the humanities and social sciences, which draws particularly on audience studies and cultural studies, but is also informed by diverse fields including literary theory, communication studies, anthropology, ethnography, psychology, media studies including feminist media studies, film studies, television studies, internet studies and queer theory, as well as the study of legal issues around copyright and fair use.

In its broadest definition, fan studies encompasses the study of fan culture and community, and associated fan activities, across a range of fandom types including media fandoms, music and celebrity fandoms, and sports and games fandoms, and covers both Western sources, such as Star Trek, Doctor Who and Star Wars, and non-western sources, such as anime, J-Pop and K-Pop. Some definitions focus on media fandom, and much study is limited to Western Anglophone sources, especially television and film. Fan activities of interest cover a wide range including joining fan clubs, attending fan conventions, visiting locations, exchanging spoilers, collecting and cosplay, as well as the creation of fanworks, such as fan fiction, fanzines, fan art, fan games, podcasts and fan vids. Fan studies also addresses common tropes in fanworks such as slash, hurt–comfort and Mary Sues.

== History ==
Fan studies grew out of cultural studies research examining the reception of popular media by fans during the 1980s and early 1990s, drawing on work by Stuart Hall, John Fiske and others. The emphasis shifted towards examining works created by fans. The earliest academic publications in fan studies appeared in the mid-1980s; these include "Romantic myth, transcendence, and Star Trek zines", by Patricia Frazer Lamb and Diane Veith (1985 or 1986), and "Pornography by women, for women, with love", by Joanna Russ (1985). The fan historian Francesca Coppa draws attention to a 1975 book, Star Trek Lives!, by the non-academic authors Jacqueline Lichtenberg, Sondra Marshak and Joan Winston.

The field is generally considered to have been founded with a cluster of publications in 1992: Textual Poachers: Television Fans & Participatory Culture, by Henry Jenkins is considered particularly formative, and Enterprising Women: Television Fandom and the Creation of Popular Myth, by Camille Bacon-Smith, which pioneers an ethnographic approach, is also commonly cited. (Note: For example:) Other works from the same year included by some scholars include "Feminism, psychoanalysis, and the study of popular culture", by Constance Penley, and the collection The Adoring Audience, edited by Lisa A. Lewis, in particular the paper by Fiske, "The cultural economy of fandom".

Jonathan Gray, Cornel Sandvoss and C. Lee Harrington identified three waves of fan studies in 2007: ethnographic research, which views fans collectively; cultural studies, considering the "replication of social and cultural hierarchies within fan- and subculture ... as a reflection and further manifestation of our social, cultural, and economic capital"; and what Paul Booth terms "everyday fandom", where fandom is considered to be "part of the fabric of our everyday lives" and the study of fandom is used to gain understanding of contemporary life.

Early fan studies work often concentrated on the production of fan fiction, especially slash, and fanzines, largely within Anglophone cultures, and frequently focusing on areas of fandom dominated by women. The focus subsequently broadened to consider other fannish practices, particularly fanvidding and other forms of fan film-making, as well as the intellectual property issues that fanworks often raise. Some early researchers attempted to counter then-prevalent negative views of fans. Another thread is the effect of the emergence of the Internet. Jenkins and other first-wave researchers characterised fans as "resistant" or "subversive" consumers, considering fandoms to represent a "democratic and socially progressive response" to the media industry; these early studies have since been characterised as "utopian" by Matt Hills, Gray, Sandvoss and Harrington, and others. For example, Gray et al. denoted first-wave studies the "Fandom Is Beautiful" era.

Some research in the early 2000s shifted in focus from fan communities towards individual fans, and broadened the area of study outside media fandom; examples include the work of Hills, Sandvoss and Steven Bailey. The focus of later work broadened to encompass non-Anglophone cultures, especially Japanese anime and manga. Threads include fan labor, the gift economy, Web 2.0, and changes in relationships between fans and commercial producers, in association with fandom increasingly representing the mainstream, as well as the educational use of fan fiction, building on Jenkins' Convergence Culture (2006).

The Fan Studies Network was founded in 2012, to facilitate global connectivity in the field. Fan studies was described in 2014 as "still in its early stages".

== Specialist journals ==
Four issues of Intensities: The Journal of Cult Media appeared in 2001–7. Transformative Works and Cultures, an open-access publication from the Organization for Transformative Works, was founded in 2008 and described as "thriving" in 2012. The Journal of Fandom Studies was founded in 2012.

== Bibliography ==
A chronological selection of some notable works include:

- Star Trek Lives!, by Jacqueline Lichtenberg, Sondra Marshak and Joan Winston (1975);
- Romantic myth, transcendence, and Star Trek zines, by Patricia Frazer Lamb and Diane Veith (1985 or 1986);
- Pornography by women, for women, with love, by Joanna Russ (1985);
- Textual Poachers: Television Fans & Participatory Culture, by Henry Jenkins (1992);
- Enterprising Women: Television Fandom and the Creation of Popular Myth, by Camille Bacon-Smith (1992);
- Feminism, psychoanalysis, and the study of popular culture, by Constance Penley (1992);
- The Adoring Audience, edited by Lisa A. Lewis (1992);
- The cultural economy of fandom, by John Fiske (1992);
- Star Trek Fans and Costume Art, by Heather R. Joseph-Witham (1996) (on cosplay);
- Legal fictions: Copyright, fan fiction, and a new common law, by Rebecca Tushnet (1997);
- Theorizing Fandom: Fans, Subculture and Identity, edited by Cheryl Harris and Alison Alexander (1998);
- Audiences: A Sociological Theory of Performance and Imagination, by Nicholas Abercrombie and Brian Longhurst (1998) (introduces the spectacle/performance paradigm);
- Tune In, Log On: Soaps, Fandom, and Online Community, by Nancy K. Baym (2000);
- The sex lives of cult television characters, by Sara Gwenllian Jones (2002);
- Fan Cultures, by Matt Hills (2002);
- The Democratic Genre: Fan Fiction in a Literary Context, by Sheenagh Pugh (2005);
- Cyberspaces of Their Own: Female Fandoms Online, by Rhiannon Bury (2005);
- Digital Get Down': Postmodern boy band slash and the queer female space, by Kristina Busse (2005);
- Fans: The Mirror of Consumption, by Cornel Sandvoss (2005);
- Media Audiences and Identity: Self-construction and the Fan Experience, by Steven Bailey (2005);
- Fan Fiction and Fan Communities in the Age of the Internet, edited by Busse and Karen Hellekson (2006);
- Archontic literature: A definition, a history, and several theories of fan fiction, by Abigail Derecho (2006);
- Fans, Bloggers, and Gamers: Exploring Participatory Culture, by Jenkins (2006);
- Convergence Culture: Where Old and New Media Collide, by Jenkins (2006);
- Fandom: Identities and Communities in a Mediated World, edited by Jonathan Gray, Sandvoss and C. Lee Harrington (2007);
- Adolescents and Online Fan Fiction, by Rebecca W. Black (2008);
- Limit play: Fan authorship between source text, intertext, and context, by Louisa E. Stein and Busse (2009);
- Otaku: Japan's Database Animals, by Hiroki Azuma (translated by Jonathan E. Abel and Shion Kono; 2009);
- A Fannish Taxonomy of Hotness, by Francesca Coppa (2009) (on fanvids);
- A Fannish Field of Value: Online Fan Gift Culture, by Hellekson (2009);
- Should Fan Fiction Be Free?, by Abigail De Kosnik (2009);
- Spreadable Media: How Audiences Create Value and Meaning in a Networked Economy, by Joshua Green and Jenkins (2011);
- Fuck Yeah, Fandom Is Beautiful, by Francesca Coppa (2014) (a response to Gray, Sandvoss and Harrington; 2007);
- See You At San Diego: An Oral History of Comic-Con, Fandom, and the Triumph of Geek Culture, by Mathew Klickstein (2022).
