= Textual Poachers =

Nonfiction book by Henry Jenkens

Textual Poachers: Television Fans & Participatory Culture
- Author: Henry Jenkins
- Cover artist: Jean Kluge
- Language: English
- Publisher: Routledge
- Publication date: 1992
- Publication place: United States
- Media type: Print
- Pages: 343
- ISBN: 0415905729

Textual Poachers: Television Fans & Participatory Culture is a nonfiction book of academic scholarship written in 1992 by television and media studies scholar Henry Jenkins. Textual Poachers explores fan culture and examines fans' social and cultural impacts.

Jenkins builds from a definition of "poaching" originally introduced by Michel de Certeau in his book The Practice of Everyday Life, where de Certeau differentiates between individuals who are "consumers" and others who are "poachers," depending on how they use resources put out by producers. Jenkins uses this idea to introduce his term "textual poachers," which he uses to describe how some fans go through texts like favorite television shows and engage with the parts that they are interested in, unlike audiences who watch the show more passively and move on to the next thing. Specifically, fans use what they've "poached" to become producers themselves, creating new cultural materials in various analytical and creative formats from "meta" essays to fan fiction, fan art, and more. In this way, Jenkins argues, fans “become active participants in the construction and circulation of textual meanings.”

Textual Poachers was highly influential in the development of fan studies as a legitimate field of academic scholarship. At the time of its publication, it also introduced many new fans to media fandom itself. Textual Poachers was unusual because it celebrated fandom instead of pathologizing fan practices and fans. Certain quotes from the book became quite popular with fans, who used one as a statement on many fan-created websites in the late 1990s and early 2000s: "Fan fiction is a way of the culture repairing the damage done in a system where contemporary myths are owned by corporations instead of owned by the folk."

An updated version of Textual Poachers was released for the book's 20th anniversary in 2012. This edition replaces the Star Trek: The Next Generation fanart by fan artist Jean Kluge that served as the first edition's cover; it also includes a teaching guide and discussion questions. Jenkins collaborated with another Star Trek fan for the cover art of the new edition.

== Synopsis ==
Textual Poachers looks at fans and participatory culture, particularly those of popular television shows such as Saturday Night Live, Star Trek, and Alien Nation, paying attention to how fans interact with and respond to the show and each other.

Jenkins examines topics such as three aspects of fans' characteristics mode of reception: ways fans draw texts close to the realm of their lived experience, the role played by rereading within fan culture, and the process by which program information gets inserted into ongoing social interactions. He also examines gender and fanfiction, as well as fan readers.

== Reception ==
Textual Poachers was generally well received by Jenkins's scholarly peers, though there were also questions about his decision to study fans, fanfiction, and fan culture seriously. In a 1993 review for Film Quarterly, Gregg Rickman states that Textual Poachers was "Sure to be a landmark in televisual studies" and that it was "the first work I know of to take the fans of such shows as Star Trek and Beauty and the Beast seriously."

In a 1997 review for H-Net (Humanities and Social Sciences Online), Anne Collins Smith writes that "This book is theoretically complex, thoroughly researched, and tightly argued. Moreover, Jenkins models admirable behavior for the popular-culture researcher, carefully balancing respect for fans' privacy and a desire to let their voices be heard. This book would be an invaluable resource for anyone working in media studies or audience theory." Elsewhere in her review, though, Smith expresses confusion about why Jenkins focuses on certain aspects of fan culture or why he maintains such a distance between himself and the fans he writes about.

The book has come to be regarded as a seminal and foundational work on fan culture, which helped to establish the field's legitimacy as a serious topic for academic inquiry. Bronwen Thomas writes in 2011 that Textual Poachers "contributed more than any previous study to the establishment of a distinctive sphere of "fan" studies, and it remains a seminal text." Francesca Coppa describes the book in 2017 as a "real field-founder that lays out many of the theories and terms still in use today", and states that it was better received among fans than Camille Bacon-Smith's Enterprising Women and Constance Penley's article "Feminism, psychoanalysis, and the study of popular culture", which both appeared in the same year.
