= Organization for Transformative Works =

Nonprofit organization for fan activity

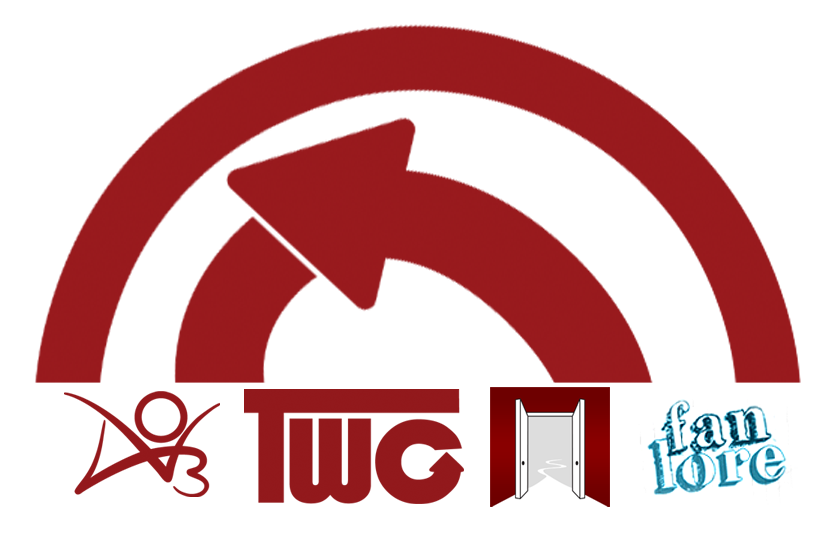
- Organization for Transformative Works (OTW) graphic banner, umbrella of OTW's projects
- Abbreviation: OTW
- Formation: 17 May 2007; 19 years ago
- Type: Non-profit
- Main organ: Board of directors, elected annually
- Website: www.transformativeworks.org

The Organization for Transformative Works (OTW) is a nonprofit, fan activist organization. Its mission is to serve fans by preserving and encouraging transformative fan activity, known as "fanwork", and by making fanwork widely accessible.

OTW advocates for the transformative, legal, and legitimate nature of fan labor activities, including fan fiction, fan videos, fan art, anime music videos, podfic (audio recordings of fan fiction), and real person fiction. Its vision is to nurture fans and fan culture, and to protect fans' transformative work from legal snafus and commercial exploitation.

OTW has 983 volunteers, net assets of approximately $3.8 million and at least 14,959 paying members according to its annual report in 2024.

== Services and platforms ==
The Organization for Transformative Works offers the following services and platforms to fans in a myriad of fandoms:

- Archive of Our Own (AO3): An open-source, non-commercial, non-profit, multi-fandom web archive built by fans for hosting fan fiction and for embedding other fanwork, including fan art, fan videos, and podfic.
- Fanlore: A wiki for fans from a wide range of communities whose published mission is to provide a platform "to record and share their histories, experiences and traditions" in fandom and fanwork history. The site suffered a data breach in August 2026.
- Open Doors: Preservation of fannish historical artifacts, such as zines and GeoCities websites, as well as transferring fanfiction to Archive of Our Own from other websites when they shut down.
- Transformative Works and Cultures: A peer-reviewed academic journal for scholarship on fanworks and practices
- Legal advocacy to the fandom community, addressing the legal issues with fan fiction and other fan works, including defending fans' fair use of copyrighted material.
- Vidding (2008): a series of six short documentaries on vidding, in combination with participatory-culture academic Henry Jenkins and the New Media Literacies project at Massachusetts Institute of Technology.
- Fanhackers: A directory of information and resources to help fans, academics, and activists, including good metadata (information, analysis, and discussion about data).

== Legal activism ==
The OTW provides legal assistance to the fandom community, addressing the legal issues with fan fiction and other fan works. Rebecca Tushnet, a noted legal scholar on fanfiction and fair use in copyright and trademark law, works with the OTW's legal project. In 2008, the OTW (in coordination with the Electronic Frontier Foundation) successfully submitted requests to the Library of Congress for further exceptions to the Digital Millennium Copyright Act to allow the fair use of video clips for certain noncommercial uses such as video remixes, commentary, and education, as well as to protect technology used for such purposes. The exceptions were also successfully renewed in 2012 and expanded in 2015. The OTW, the Electronic Frontier Foundation, and New Media Rights submitted a new petition for exemptions in 2018.

The OTW has also submitted several amicus briefs to the courts in several cases involving intellectual property law:

- In Fox v. Dish, the OTW (in coalition with the Electronic Frontier Foundation and Public Knowledge) submitted an amicus brief which argued in defense of digital recording methods used by Dish Network, claiming that "The popular fanwork genre of noncommercial videos ('vids') uses clips from television shows or film, reworking them in a way that comments on or critiques the original. The Copyright Office has held that substantial numbers of vids constitute fair uses. But the creation of fan vids requires intermediate digital copying and processing in order to produce the transformative final product. OTW thus believes that intermediate copying performed to facilitate fair use constitutes fair use."
- In the case of Ryan Hart v. Electronic Arts, the OTW (in combination with the Digital Media Law Project and the International Documentary Association) submitted a brief arguing that Electronic Arts's use of factual information (such as the height, weight, and jersey number of football players) in creative works (in this case, video games) is protected by the First Amendment to the United States Constitution.

== Fandom archival projects ==
The OTW has also instituted several projects for preserving fan history and culture. One such project was the creation of Fanlore, a wiki for preserving fandom history. The Fanlore wiki was first revealed in beta in 2008, with a full release in December 2010. In June 2018, there were approximately 45,000 articles and 800,000 edits to the wiki, and it passed a million edits in January 2021.

The OTW also has several "Open Doors" projects dedicated to the preservation of fannish historical artifacts. These projects include The Fan Culture Preservation Project, a joint venture between the OTW and the Special Collections department at the University of Iowa to archive and preserve fanzines and other non-digital forms of fan culture, and The GeoCities Rescue Project, which attempted to preserve content originally hosted on Yahoo's GeoCities by transferring that content to new locations on the Archive of Our Own or within the Fanlore wiki. Other miscellaneous artifacts and collections are stored on the OTW's main servers in the Special Collections gallery.

== Archive of Our Own ==
Created by the OTW, the Archive of Our Own (often shortened to AO3) is an open-source, non-commercial, non-profit archive for fan fiction and other transformative fanwork. The Archive is built and run entirely by volunteers, many without previous coding experience. The Archive was publicly launched into open beta on 14 November 2009, and has been growing steadily since.

Time magazine included Archive of Our Own on its list of "50 Best Websites 2013". Time said that AO3 "serves all fandoms equally, from The A-Team to Zachary Quinto and beyond", and also called it "the most carefully curated, sanely organized, easily browsable and searchable nonprofit collection of fan fiction on the Web...".

Fans post, tag and categorize their own works on AO3. Volunteer "tag wranglers" link similar tags so readers can search for works in the categories and types they want. The tagging system allows easy compilation of statistics (stats).

Fan fiction ranges in length, from fewer than one thousand words (flash fiction, or one-hundred-word drabbles) to novel-length works, up to millions of words in length. According to an article on fandom statistics published on The Daily Dot newspaper in 2013, AO3 hosts more very short works than long ones, but readers prefer the longer works. The average very short story received fewer than 150 hits, while novel-length works are more likely to receive around 1,500 hits.

A writer who posts a story on AO3 can record its word count on the story's header, along with other information such as the story's fandom, ships, and other tropes. Some fan works are 'crossovers' that draw on two or more universes or characters. Writers can also note if their story is finished or a work in progress (WIP).

As of August 2026, the archive hosts more than 18 million works in more than 80,000 fandoms. Destination Toast, fan and statistician, compiles and analyzes fandom statistics, especially stats from Archive of Our Own, which she says is "the most easily searchable archive I know of." In January 2016, she posted "2015: A (Statistical) Year in Fandom." It includes statistics from two other large fan fiction archives, FanFiction.Net (FFN) and Wattpad as well as the popular microblog platform Tumblr. The post shows that the most active fandoms on AO3 in 2015 were (largest first) Supernatural, Dragon Age, Harry Potter, The Avengers, Teen Wolf, and Sherlock. Other media sources include movies, television shows, and books including The Lord of the Rings, Doctor Who, and The Hunger Games.

== Transformative Works and Cultures ==
Transformative Works and Cultures
- Discipline: Interdisciplinary
- Language: English
- Edited by: Kristina Busse, Karen Hellekson

Publication details
- History: 2008–present
- Publisher: Organization for Transformative Works
- Open access: Yes
- License: Creative Commons Attribution-Noncommercial 3.0 (2008–2017); Creative Commons Attribution 4.0 (2017–present)
- Impact factor: (2015)

Standard abbreviations
- ISO 4: Transform. Works Cult.

Indexing
- ISSN: 1941-2258

Links
- Journal homepage

Transformative Works and Cultures is a peer-reviewed, open-access academic journal published by the Organization for Transformative Works. The journal collects essays, articles, book reviews, and shorter pieces that concern fandom, fanworks, and fan practices. According to Humanities, Arts, Science and Technology Alliance and Collaboratory (HASTAC), the journal "supports the [Organization for Transformative Works's] mission to promote the legitimacy and sustainability of non-commercial fan creativity by providing a forum for innovative criticism in fan studies, broadly conceived."

The founding editors were Kristina Busse and Karen Hellekson. They stepped down from their editorial positions in favor of Mel Stanfill and Poe Johnson in 2022. It covers "popular media, fan communities, and transformative works".

The journal has raised the academic profile of female fan communities and transformative works, including fan fiction, fan art, fan vids, and cosplay, by serving as a central publication venue for these topics. Coppa states that many second-wave fan fiction scholars, such as herself, started to publish in Transformative Works and Cultures and that the journal has "nurtured a new wave of scholars". Via a number of articles, the journal has had a hand in helping to spread Jenkins, Sam Ford, and Joshua Green's idea of "spreadable media".
