= Kristina Busse =

American pedagogue

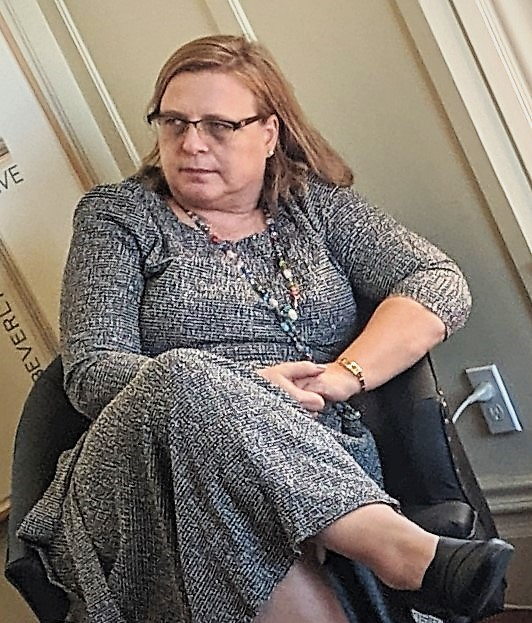
- Busse at the Berkeley Center for New Media Fan Studies Salon in 2019
- Born: November 9, 1967 (age 58); Germany

Academic background
- Education: MA, English, 1993, PhD, English, 2002, Tulane University
- Thesis: Imagining Auschwitz: Postmodern Representations of the Holocaust (2002)

Academic work
- Institutions: University of South Alabama
- Main interests: fan studies
- Website: kristinabusse.com

Kristina Dorothea Busse (born November 29, 1967) is a professor in the Philosophy department at the University of South Alabama. As the co-editor of Transformative Works and Cultures, her research focuses on fanfiction communities and fan culture. Alongside fandom academics Alexis Lothian and Robin Anne Reid, she coined the term "queer female space" in 2007.

== Early life and education ==
Busse was born on November 29, 1967. She earned her diploma and intermediate examination at the University of Mainz in Germany before travelling to the United States to complete her graduate degrees at Tulane University.

== Career ==
Upon joining the faculty in the Philosophy department at the University of South Alabama (USA), Busse published her first co-edited book with Karen Hellekson titled Fan Fiction and Fan Communities in the Age of the Internet. The book was a collection of essays on the topic of fan fiction; such as fan culture, fanfiction communities, and fan experiences. Alongside fandom academics Alexis Lothian and Robin Anne Reid, she coined the term "queer female space" in 2007 to describe the construction of a “fannish fantasy space as a place where women can experiment and explore” within slash fan communities on LiveJournal.

As a board member of the Organization for Transformative Works (OTW), Busse collaborated with Hellekson to establish the Transformative Works and Cultures academic journal through the OTW. They came to the idea of an academic fan studies journal after witnessing discussions for Archive of Our Own, a fanfiction archive. Together, they found an open-access platform to share their records and picked an editorial board to oversee their research papers prior to print. Busse continued her research into fandom communities and published her second book with Louisa Stein in 2012 titled Sherlock and Transmedia Fandom. Similar to her first book, this was a collection of essays examining the cultural intersections and fan traditions surrounding the Sherlock Holmes fandom.

As a result of her scholarship in fanfiction, Busse and Hellekson co-edited The Fan Fiction Studies Reader, a collection of texts surrounding the field fandom, identity, and feminism. They argued that the study of fanfiction was becoming increasingly more important because of the success of fanfiction turned movies, such as the Fifty Shades trilogy series.

Busse submitted expert witness testimony on behalf of writer Zoey Ellis in the Omegaverse copyright lawsuit, which received widespread media attention for the questions it raised about intellectual property.

== Selected publications ==
- Framing Fan Fiction: Literary and Social Practices in Fan Fiction Communities (2017)
- The Fan Fiction Studies Reader (Co-edited with Karen Hellekson 2014)
- Sherlock and Transmedia Fandom (Co-edited with Louisa Stein 2012)
- Fan Fiction and Fan Communities in the Age of the Internet (Co-edited with Karen Hellekson 2006)
