= Mary Bray =

Mary Bray may refer to:

- Mary Pipher (born 1947), also known as Mary Bray Pipher, American clinical psychologist and author
- Mary Kay Bray Award, a science fiction award
