= Slash fiction =

Genre of same-sex romantic fan fiction

The slash symbol, used to separate the two names in a romantic pairing, gives its name to slash fiction.

Slash fiction (also known as slashfic) is a genre of fan fiction that focuses on romantic or sexual relationships between fictional characters of the same sex.

While the term "slash" originally referred only to stories in which male characters are involved in an explicit sexual relationship as a primary plot element ("m/m slash"), it is now also used to refer to any fan story containing a romantic pairing between same-sex characters. Many fans distinguish slash with female characters as a separate genre, commonly referred to as femslash (also known as "f/f slash" or "femmeslash").

These fan-written stories are not often accepted in a work's canon, and the characters are usually not engaged in such relationships in their respective fictional universes.

== History ==
It is commonly believed that slash fan fiction originated during the late 1960s, within the Star Trek: The Original Series fan fiction fandom, starting with "Kirk/Spock" stories generally authored by female fans of the series and distributed privately among friends. The name arises from the use of the slash symbol (/) in mentions in the late '70s of K/S (meaning stories where Kirk and Spock had a romantic [and often sexual] relationship), as compared to the ampersand (&) conventionally used for K&S or Kirk and Spock friendship fiction. For a time, both slash and K/S (for "Kirk/Spock") were used interchangeably. Slash later spread to other fan groups, first Starsky and Hutch, Blake's 7, and The Professionals, then many others, eventually creating a fandom based on the concept of slash. Many early slash stories were based on a pairing of two close friends, a "hero dyad", or "One True Pairing", such as Kirk/Spock or Starsky/Hutch; conversely, a classic pairing between foils was that of Blake/Avon from Blake's 7.

The first K/S stories were not immediately accepted by all Star Trek fans. Later, authors such as Joanna Russ studied and reviewed the phenomenon in essays and gave the genre some academic respectability. Greater subsequent tolerance and acceptance of homosexuality and increased frustration with the portrayal of gay relationships in mainstream media fed a growing desire in authors to explore the subjects on their own terms, using established media characters. Star Trek slash fiction remained important to fans, while new slash fiction grew up around other television shows, movies, and books with sci-fi or action-adventure roots.

Early slash fans in England feared that they would be arrested, because slash violated the obscenity laws there at the time.

=== Slash sources ===
From its earliest days, slash fiction has been particularly inspired by popular speculative fiction franchises, possibly because speculative fiction may lack well-developed female characters or because the speculative elements allow greater freedom to reinterpret canonical characters. However, other large bodies of slash fiction, such as Starsky and Hutch or The Professionals, are based on non-speculative sources.

Slash fiction follows popular media, and new stories are constantly produced. There is some correlation between the popularity and activity of each variety of slash fiction and those of the source of the material. Some slash fiction readers and writers tend to adhere closely to the canonical source of their fiction, while other participants may follow the slash content without being fans of the original source material itself.

=== Slash on the Internet ===
Until the Internet became accessible to the general public in the early 1990s, slash was hard to find. It was published only in fan-edited non-profit fanzines (often called only "zines"), which were usually priced just high enough to recoup printing costs, and were sold via adzines or at conventions. With the advent of the Internet, slash fiction writers created mailing lists which gradually took the place of amateur press associations (APA), and websites such as FanFiction.Net (which gradually started taking the place of zines).

Forum boards and message boards were active during the first half of the first decade of the millennium, and sites such as Angelfire, GeoCities, and ProBoards were quite successful. Other venues in which slash was, and still is, published are Facebook and private groups. Much later came Archive of Our Own. As slash publishing gradually moved to the Internet, the field opened to more writers, and a greater quantity of material was published.

The Internet allowed slash authors more freedom than print: stories could include branching story lines, links, collages, song mixes, and other innovations. The Internet increased slash visibility and the number of readers, as readers were now able to access the stories from their own home at a much lower cost, since zines cost more than an Internet connection. The number of fandoms represented increased dramatically, especially those devoted to science fiction, fantasy, and police dramas. The Internet also increased the level of reader interaction, making it easier for fans to comment on stories, give episode reviews, and discuss comment on trends in slash fandom itself. Websites and fanzines dedicated to fans of The X-Files, Stargate, Harry Potter, and Buffy the Vampire Slayer became common, with tens of thousands of slash stories available.

== Critical and queer attention ==
Slash fiction has received more academic attention than other genres of fan fiction. Slash fiction was the subject of several notable academic studies in the early 1990s, as part of the cultural studies movement within the humanities: most of these, as is characteristic of cultural studies, approach slash fiction from an ethnographic perspective and talk primarily about the writers of slash fiction and the communities that form around it. Slashers have been configured as fans who resisted culture. Some studies – for example by Italian anthropologist Mirna Ciconi – focus on the textual analysis of slash fiction itself.

Slash fiction was often ignored by queer theorists. However, slash fiction has been described as important to the LGBTQ community and to the formation of queer identities, as it represents a resistance to the expectation of heterosexuality. In a society in which heterosexuality is the norm and homosexuality is highly stigmatized, an online forum is sometimes the only space where young members of the LGBTQ community can be out. Young members of the community go through a time in which they are still exploring their identity, labels, and pronouns. By writing slash fiction, queer youth can use their favorite characters and stories in order to create scenarios that allow them to explore their feelings, thoughts, and selves. Slash fiction, in this sense, offers queer youth a low-risk chance to explore who they are. They can stay anonymous while creating a world in which they can express themselves creatively and freely. However, slash fiction has also been criticized as being unrepresentative of the gay community as a whole, and as being used as a medium to express feminist frustration with popular and speculative fiction.

The predominant demographic among slash fiction readers is female. Science fiction writer Joanna Russ (herself a lesbian), author of How to Suppress Women's Writing, is one of the first major science fiction writers to take slash fiction and its cultural and literary implications seriously. In her essay "Pornography by Women for Women, with Love," Russ argues that, in regard to the Kirk/Spock relationship, slash fiction combines both masculine and feminine traits of emotional vulnerability. Such an equal relationship, she contends, negates the power imbalance typically seen in regular fan fiction.

== Definition and ambiguity ==
Slash fiction fandoms tend to be diverse and segregated, and each has its own rules of style, etiquette, history, and favorite stories and authors.

Slash cannot be commercially distributed due to copyright laws, and, until the 1990s, it was either undistributed or published in zines. Today, slash fiction is most commonly published on Tumblr, LiveJournal accounts and other websites online, such as Archive of Our Own. Legal scholars promoting copyright reform sometimes use slash fiction as an example of semiotic democracy.

The term slash fiction contains several ambiguities. Due to the lack of canonical homosexual relationships in source media at the time that slash fiction began to emerge, some came to see slash fiction stories as being exclusively outside their respective canons and held that the term "slash fiction" applies only when the characters' same-sex romantic or erotic relationship about which an author writes is not part of the source's canon and that fan fiction about canonical same-sex relationships is therefore not slash. The recent appearance on screen of openly gay and bisexual characters, such as Willow and Tara in the television series Buffy the Vampire Slayer, the characters of Queer as Folk, Jack Harkness in Doctor Who, and numerous characters in Torchwood, has occasioned much additional discussion of this problem. Abiding by the aforementioned definition leaves such stories without a convenient label, so this distinction has not been widely adopted.

Some slash authors also write slash fiction which contains transgender themes and transgender/transsexual or intersex characters. As a result, the exact definition of the term has often been hotly debated within various slash fandoms. The strictest definition holds that only stories about relationships between two male partners ('M/M') constitute 'slash fiction', which has led to the evolution of the term femslash. Slash-like fiction is also written in various Japanese anime or manga fandoms but is commonly referred to as shōnen-ai or yaoi for relationships between male characters, and shōjo-ai or yuri between female characters, respectively.

Due to the increasing popularity and prevalence of slash on the Internet in recent years, some use slash as a generic term for any erotic fan fiction, whether it depicts heterosexual or homosexual relationships. This has caused concern for other slash writers, who believe that, while it can be erotic, slash is not, by definition, so, and that defining all erotic fiction as slash makes such fiction unsuitable for potential underage readers of homoromantic fan fiction. In addition, a number of journalists writing about the fan fiction phenomenon in general seem to believe that all fan fiction is slash, or at least erotic in character. Such definitions fail to distinguish between erotic and romantic slash, and between slash, het (works focusing primarily on heterosexual relationships) and gen (works which do not include a romantic focus).

The slash mark itself (/), when put between character's names, has come to mean a shorthand label for a romantic relationship, regardless of whether the pairing is heterosexual or homosexual, romantic or erotic.

== Slash and the original media sources ==
For many people, slash is a controversial subject. In addition to the legal issues associated with traditional fan fiction, some people believe that it tarnishes established media characters to portray them in a way which was never illustrated canonically. But official disapproval of slash, specifically, is hard to find. As early as 1981, Lucasfilm has issued legal notices to fans who wrote sexually explicit stories. J. K. Rowling/Warner Brothers have sent cease and desist letters referencing "sexually explicit" writings on the web, though Rowling approves the writing of fan fiction in general, posting links to fan fiction on her website and openly acknowledging slash fiction while maintaining that pairings such as those between Harry/Draco and Harry/Snape are non-canonical.

In contrast, some media creators have been more receptive to slash. In the Angel DVD commentary for "A Hole in the World", Joss Whedon, the creator of Angel, said, "Spike and Angel...they were hanging out for years and years and years. They were all kinds of deviant. Are people thinking they never...? Come on, people! They're open-minded guys!" as well as Spike saying, "Angel and me have never been intimate. Except that one..." to Illyria in the episode "Power Play." Renaissance Pictures invited femslash author Melissa Good to pen scripts for Xena: Warrior Princess. Some people say they see similar evidence of such relationships in other shows such as Smallville, Supernatural and Due South.

Due South's fandom was one of the first to go online, after the show debuted in 1994. In 1999 Due South creator Paul Haggis participated in a question-and-answer panel with an online Due South newsgroup. The newsgroup asked Haggis if he had a problem with fans seeing the characters he created (Detective Ray Vecchio and Constable Benton Fraser) as being in love with each other and having a closeted relationship. Haggis replied, "Absolutely no problem at all. If ever two people loved each other, it's Ray and Fraser."

Furthermore, the YouTubers Daniel Howell and Phil Lester (Daniel Howell and amazingphil) are well known for being very accepting of slash fiction and even wrote some fanfiction about themselves, which was featured in their book The Amazing Book is Not on Fire. In addition, their stage show, The Amazing Tour is Not on Fire, included a section called Fanfiction Live.

In the episode "The Monster at the End of This Book" of the TV show Supernatural, the main characters encounter fictional representations of themselves in a series of books. They find the online fandom, and comment about their activities including the writing of slash fanfiction. This is often referred to by fans of Supernatural as Wincest, based on the characters' surname (Winchester) and the fact that they are brothers (incest).

The revival of Doctor Who led by the openly gay writer Russell T Davies has also seen nods towards the slash fans beyond the omnisexual Captain Jack Harkness and other characters from the spin-off Torchwood. Many fans see exchanges between the Doctor and the Master (played in the new series by John Simm, whose Life On Mars character Sam Tyler is also the subject of a lot of slash fiction) as indicative of a previous relationship, or current attraction. At one point the Master says to the Doctor "I like it when you use my name", and in a Children in Need special, the Tenth Doctor tells the Fifth, after being asked whether the Master still has "that rubbish beard", "No, no beard this time. Well, a wife." – which fans point to as a reference to gay men marrying a woman for public respectability, the wife being referred to as "a beard". This was later expanded upon and confirmed when the Master reincarnated into a female form called Missy (played by Michelle Gomez) with an explicit kiss between both characters during the Series 8 finale "Dark Water/Death in Heaven" as well as the Doctor confessing to Bill in World Enough and Time that "[Missy] was my man crush....Yeah, I think she was a man back then. Fairly sure I was too, but it was a long time ago.". Additionally, the writer for the 2003 webcast Scream of the Shalka Paul Cornell has accepted the interpretation of the Doctor's (played by Richard E. Grant) and the Master's (played by gay actor Derek Jacobi) dynamic as being a romantic one. In the wider Doctor Who fandom, this ship is titled as "Thoschei".

The term for shows that seem to be giving material for slash writers to use is "pre-slashed", sometimes "pre-slashed for your convenience".

== Slash fandom ==
=== Conventions ===
Several slash conventions run throughout the year and across the globe, mostly in the United States, including Escapade in California, REVELcon in Texas, Connexions in Maryland, MediaWest*Con in Michigan, CON.TXT in Washington, D.C., Con*Strict in Nevada, Connotations in England, Zebracon in Illinois, Yaoi-Con in California, Bascon in California, and others.

=== Terminology ===
Slash fiction has created and appropriated words to denote peculiarities found within the fandom. "Gayfic" is sometimes used to refer to stories focusing on gay male relationships, and "femslash" or "f/f" used to indicate that a work features female characters in slash relationships.

Slash fiction, like other fan fiction, sometimes borrows the MPAA film rating system to indicate the amount of sexual content in the story. Not all slash fiction has explicit sexual content – the interaction between two characters can be as innocent as holding hands or a chaste kiss, or even contain nothing but unfulfilled yearning; stories may be labeled "UST" for "unresolved sexual tension". Some sites require all stories to be rated and have warnings attached, often by using a beta reader.

The term no lemon is sometimes used to indicate fan fiction stories without explicit sexual content. Anything with explicit content, especially with erotic scenes without accompanying romantic scenes, may be labeled "lemon". The term lemon arose from the anime/yaoi fandoms, referring to a hentai anime series, Cream Lemon. The term squick is most often used as a warning to refer to a reader's possible negative reaction to scenes in the text (often sexual) that some might find offensive or distressing, such as those including incest, BDSM, rape, "mpreg" (male pregnancy), gender swapping, and torture. The term originated in the Usenet newsgroup alt.sex.bondage in 1991. Squicks are often listed as a warning in the header of a fanfiction story.

The term "slasher" is used for someone who creates slash fiction, and the term "slashy" is used to mean "homoerotic". "Slashy moments" are those events in the canonical storyline which slashers interpret as homoerotic, which in turn form the slashers' depiction of the characters in slash fiction.

Within the brony fandom, slash fiction between the characters of My Little Pony: Friendship Is Magic are colloquially termed "fillyfooling" for mare-to-mare relationships and "coltcuddling" for stallion-to-stallion relationships.

== Subgenres ==
=== Femslash ===
Femslash or femmeslash is a subgenre of slash fiction which focuses on romantic and/or sexual relationships between female fictional characters. Typically, characters featured in femslash are heterosexual in the canonical universe; however, similar fan fiction about lesbian characters are commonly labeled as femslash for convenience. The term is generally applied only to fanworks based on Western fandoms; the nearest anime/manga equivalents are more often called yuri and shōjo-ai fanfiction. Femslash is also known as "f/f slash", "femmeslash", and "saffic", the last term blending the words Sapphic and fiction.

There is less femslash than there is slash based on male couples – it has been suggested that heterosexual female slash authors generally do not write femslash, and that it is rare to find a fandom with two sufficiently engaging female characters. Janeway/Seven is the main Star Trek femslash pairing, as only they have "an on-screen relationship fraught with deep emotional connection and conflict". Although it is debated whether fanfiction about canonical lesbians such as Willow and Tara of Buffy the Vampire Slayer counts as "slash", their relationship storylines are more coy than heterosexual ones, which entices Willow/Tara femslash authors to fill in the gaps in the known relationship storyline. It is "relatively recently" that male writers have begun writing femslash.

Another suggestion in which there is less femslash is its lack of strong female characters in media. TV shows are heavily skewed toward the portrayal of men, with only two notable predominant female TV shows: Xena: Warrior Princess and Orange is the New Black. In these two cases, because there is an overwhelming number of strong female characters, femslash is much more popular. Otherwise, shows with a skew towards men are more popular, as women portrayed in these shows are weaker supporting characters.

=== Chanslash ===
Chanslash is the portrayal of underage characters in sexual situations in slash fiction. The prefix chan most likely comes from the Japanese name suffix used as a term of endearment toward children or women. It may be a nod towards yaoi fandoms, in which underage pairings are more commonplace. Owners of the intellectual property rights to characters in this type of slash are often unhappy with chanslash because of the potential legal ramifications and concern over negatively affecting the popularity of the character. Some studios owning the rights to slashed characters have issued cease and desist orders in the past as a result of this type of slash. Chanslash is also called shotacon (abbreviated as "shouta" or "shota") when dealing with anime fanfiction.

=== Real person slash ===
Real person slash (RPS), also a subgenre of real person fiction, involves taking a celebrity's public image and creating slash stories with them. Real person slash gained popularity with the 1990s rise of boy bands in the pop music industry. In the Supernatural fandom, slash fans who were uncomfortable with shipping the two main brother characters moved into writing and reading Jsquared/J2 fic (slash involving the lead actors Jared Padalecki and Jensen Ackles). This led to the phrase "Supernatural fandom – where RPS is the moral high ground". Though increasingly common, RPS is considered a potential "squick" for slash readers. In addition, the use of celebrities in fictional, sexual stories remains controversial. Journals including RPS often include disclaimers that explain their true fictional nature. Henry Jenkins says that RPS may be "troubling" to the old guard of slash. Fans of real person slash state that the personas presented by the common figures of RPS such as boy bands, celebrities, athletes and pro wrestlers are "largely manufactured" for the pleasure of female fans, "so why not just run with them?"

=== Reverse slash ===
Reverse slash is a term used for fanfic without any sexual content, or very little sexual content, compared to the canon. The term is believed to have originated when non-sexual fanfic based on the Anita Blake series began to circulate. Fanfic without sexual content can also be referred to as 'genfic', short for general fiction, non-romantic in nature.

=== Original slash ===
Original slash stories are those that contain male/male content, based on perceived homoerotic subtext between fictitious characters. This can be sourced from a variety of media content, such as manga, TV shows, movies and books amongst others. These works are now generally published online and use the same forms of rating, warnings and terminology that is commonly used by slash writers.

Slash has a different sensibility to gay fiction, probably because most slash readers are female and in a closed community that shares their tastes, which makes most stories in the genre centered into emotional relationships, even as sex is very prominent.

A different variety of homoerotic amateur fiction is original yaoi, from the manga/anime genre yaoi (boy-love), popularized in the West by subbers and scanlations.

Both (original slash and original yaoi) are terms that are considered somewhat controversial by some slash fans since they feel that the term 'slash' can only refer to works of fan fiction and not original works.

=== Omegaverse ===
Omegaverse is a subgenre of speculative erotic fiction that originated as a subgenre of slash fiction. In Omegaverse works, humans are either dominant "alphas", neutral "betas" or submissive "omegas", and they exhibit sexual traits and behaviors based on those of wolves or other wild animals. The first Omegaverse slash fiction was written about the TV series Supernatural in the 2010s. The subgenre has become so popular that it evolved into a genre of original erotic fiction in its own right, independent from its roots in fan fiction. The earliest commercial publication using omegaverse tropes is With Caution by J.L. Langley. The trope gained rapid popularity in Japan in the mid-2010s through fan dōjinshi and has become a subgenre of yaoi works. In Japanese works, Omegaverse also introduces a caste system, where Alphas are depicted as the upper class elites while Omegas are at the bottom tier and face discrimination. Omegas can get pregnant in spite of being male.

== Other slash fanworks ==
=== Slash art ===
In addition to fiction, fans also create artwork depicting media characters in same-sex relationship contexts. Initially, slash art was mostly used in covers and interior pages of fanzines, and sold to other fans at media and slash conventions.

=== Slash manips ===
In recent years, more slash artwork has used widespread availability of imaging software, like Adobe Photoshop, to manipulate photographs of their subjects to produce romantic or erotic images (often referred to as slash manips) which imply a homosexual relationship, either as static pictures or animated GIFs. When the manipulated photos depict real people instead of media characters, the creation of these images can be as contentious as real person slash, and for many of the same reasons.

=== Slash vidding ===
Vidding has existed in media fandom since the 1980s, and slash vidding is still a popular movement within vidding. Slash vidders take clips of characters and through juxtaposition, song choice, and other techniques, portray a slash relationship on screen. Vidding used to be very guarded within the slash community, among other reasons, because the songs used in videos are copyrighted. When vidders started putting their videos online, their sites were routinely password protected, etc.

Today that has changed with vids, and vid-like projects, available on YouTube and other video sites. Most of these vids are made by slash (and gen) fans, but many of them are made by people who are not aware of media fandom.

=== Slash roleplay ===
Sometimes referred to as yaoi (male/male) or yuri (female/female), roleplay involving same-sex characters in relationships can be either with canonical or original character creations. There are slash roleplaying based on Dungeons & Dragons, Supernatural, Naruto, World of Warcraft and Dragon Age, among others.

There are many mediums used to approach the act of internet roleplaying including message boards, AIM, IRC and specially created chatrooms on servers. Some roleplay is very strict and requires players to be able to type a paragraph or two per each turn, some use strict guidelines involving roleplay dice and some are combinations of all of the above.

Not every roleplay community accepts slash, however, and some people specifically disallow the use of it in their community as not being canonical or simply the operators do not care for slash.

== See also ==
- Erotic fantasy
- Gay romance
- Homoerotica
- My Little Pony: Friendship Is Magic fan fiction
- Sex and sexuality in speculative fiction
- Shipping
