= Real person fiction =

Genre of fiction involving real people

Real person fiction or real people fiction (RPF) is a genre of fan fiction featuring celebrities or other real people, as opposed to established fictional characters.

Before the term "real person fiction" came into common usage, fans came up with a variety of terms, which are still used for specific genres or cultural practices in the RPF community; for example, bandfic, popslash, or actorfic. The genre includes stories about actors, athletes, comedians, historical figures, musicians, YouTubers, newsworthy people, and reality show contestants, among others, as well as fiction about the fans themselves.

== Description ==
In general, the authors seem to adopt the public personas of the celebrities in question as their own characters, building a fictional universe based on the supposed real-life histories of their idols. Information from interviews, documentaries, music videos, and other publicity sources are assimilated into the stories. It is also very popular to write fiction about celebrity couples. Communities of writers build collective archetypes based on the celebrities' public personas. Communities also develop their own ethics on what sort of stories are acceptable – some are uncomfortable with slash fiction, or with mention of the celebrity's real-life families, or with stories involving suicide, murder, or rape. Like most fan fiction, the RPF genre includes stories of every kind, from innocuous to sadistic to pornographic. The genre can be considered postmodern.

Many fan fiction writers consider writing real person fiction unethical, and the genre is considered somewhat separate from media-based fan fiction, both within fandom communities and academic disciplines like fan studies. This has not stopped mainstream legacy media outlets from giving legitimacy to such fiction in some cases: Chinese outlet Sina World News, in 2016, for example, promoted a hypothetical friendly written correspondence between badminton athletes Lin Dan of China and Lee Chong Wei of Malaysia immediately after the 2016 Olympics semifinals in which Lin defeated Lee in the peak of their competitive rivalry. The "letter" when translated to Malay and English however was misrepresented as actual correspondence as it spread on Malaysian social medias, which the Malaysian Olympic contingent including Lee himself immediately quashed.

A significant minority of RPF stories take the form of "Mary Sue fan fiction", which feature a "Mary Sue" character, usually, but not always female, who is described in extremely idealistic terms and is described as a wish-fulfillment image of the author. A Mary Sue may become romantically involved with a band member or actor, join a film cast, prove to have superior acting or singing ability, and/or possess incredible beauty.

Politician fic is sometimes used as a form of satire, or to highlight the underlying biases or attitudes of the politician being portrayed, although more recently there has been an increase in more "ordinary" fan fiction about British politicians in particular, with a notable emphasis on slash.

== History ==
During the 1940s, the Whitman Publishing Company released authorized real person fiction, possibly as a boost to the careers of the Hollywood stars of that era. Described as "The Newest, Up-To-The-Minute Mystery and Adventure Stories for Boys and Girls, featuring your favorite characters", a variety of famous actors and actresses were spotlighted, including Ginger Rogers, Betty Grable, John Payne, Ann Sheridan, Jane Withers, Bonita Granville, Gene Autry, Deanna Durbin and Ann Rutherford. The hardcover publications had colorful dustjackets with a photo of the celebrity on the front, and several illustrations of the actor or actress inside the volume. Liberties were taken with the identities of the celebrities; for example, in the story "Ginger Rogers and the Riddle of the Scarlet Cloak", the "Ginger Rogers" character is not an actress at all, but is instead a telephone operator who becomes involved in a mystery.

The original edition of the "Three Investigators" children's crime series was billed as "Alfred Hitchcock and the Three Investigators", with Hitchcock as mentor to the eponymous heroes.

Jean Lorrah's "Visit to a Weird Planet", published in Spockanalia 3 (1968), was a lighthearted two-parter about what would happen if a transporter malfunction caused the Star Trek characters to be swapped with the 20th-century actors who played them. Regina Marvinny, editor of Tricorder Readings, encouraged fans in the early 1970s to write "what-if" stories about meeting Leonard Nimoy. However, some of the earliest known published cases of RPF come from 1977, when fanzines of the band Led Zeppelin began to print some of the fan fiction being written. Due to the fact that these stories involved real Zeppelin band members, most notably Jimmy Page and Robert Plant, names were changed to pseudonyms such as "Tris" and "Alex".

Starting in 1984, Elliot Roosevelt wrote a series of detective novels, casting his real-life mother Eleanor Roosevelt in the role of a crime solving sleuth, with titles like Murder and the First Lady, Murder in the Oval Office, and Murder in the Lincoln Bedroom.

Real person fiction about musicians dates back to at least the 1970s, when slash fiction about bands – particularly Led Zeppelin – became popular. It circulated in fanzines in the 1980s and 1990s and moving online in the 1990s. Fanfiction about the Beatles has also been prominent, with fanmade zines dating back to the 1960s, but never resurfacing. Notably, professionally made Beatles RPF exists. There are several films that have been made that feature fictionalized aspects of the band's real life. Among these are I Wanna Hold Your Hand, Two of Us, and Nowhere Boy. All of these movies focus on the Beatles, and feature some sort of fictionalization of real events, making them Bealtes RPF. There also exists typical Beatles RPF that is just fanfiction, but it is not as popular a medium as the films mentioned. Debate has circled about whether or not Beatles films Help! (film) and Yellow Submarine (film) count as Beatles RPF.

The RPF community was, for a period of time, centered on the website FanFiction.Net. When the RPF section was removed from FanFiction.Net in 2002, the community dispersed to smaller web archives and LiveJournal communities. RPF is generally totally absent from Usenet, especially in older and more established newsgroups. Until it shut down in 2014, Quizilla was a popular website for publishing RPF.

The website The Nifty Archive was a notable repository of boy band and celebrity erotica. Other music-related RPF websites include rockfic.com for RPF involving rock stars (its inaugural story was a slash pairing between Metallica's James Hetfield and Kirk Hammett), and Metal Fic, specifically for heavy metal artists.

Another popular website for RPF chosen by youth fan fic writers is Winglin.net or Asianfanfics.com, which is more commonly centered on Taiwanese, Korean, Japanese, Vietnamese or Chinese musicians and actors, like TVXQ, Super Junior, Big Bang, SHINee, EXO, Mike He, S.H.E, and others.

In 2009, the Organization for Transformative Works launched the website Archive of Our Own, which included categories for RPF.

Real celebrities have been commercially re-imagined as fictional detectives including Angela Merkel and Queen Elizabeth II.

== Controversy ==
=== Morality and legality ===
The first known case of legal action being taken as a result of RPF is from 2003, when FanDomination.net received a cease and desist order from a representative of baseball player Andy Pettitte.

In 2008, a man was arrested in the UK for writing and publishing on the Internet a story featuring various members of the band Girls Aloud under the Obscene Publications Act. The story described the kidnap, rape and murder of the women. He was subsequently tried (the R v Walker trial), found not guilty, and claimed that he had never intended to frighten or intimidate the band members.

=== Real person slash ===
Real person slash (RPS), also known in some circles as real-life slash (RLS), involves relationships. These are usually complete fabrications, not based on any real-life indications of the subject's sexual orientation, but on the fantasies of the author and the desire to experiment with perceived or invented erotic subtext between the idols in question. Slash is roughly equal in popularity to less controversial types of real person fiction.

The content of the stories can range from the mildly romantic, involving deep friendships and innocent crushes, to carefully written love stories, all the way to explicit erotica.

Due to the potentially libelous nature of some stories, and the knowledge or fear that some celebrities dislike slash fiction involving themselves, some fan fiction communities denounce RPS fiction and do not allow it on their websites.

This type of RPF also brings up issues of consent and objectification of real people.

== See also ==
- Historical fiction – Genre of fiction that is set in the past
- Non-fiction novel – Literary genre
- Roman à clef – Novel about real events overlaid with a façade of fiction
- Tuckerization – Humorous use of real names in fiction
- Legal issues with fan fiction
- Personality rights – Individuals' control of their identity for commercial uses
- Larries – Internet fandom of the ship Harry Styles and Louis Tomlinson
- Craig Brown (satirist) – English critic and satirist (born 1957)
- Prime Minister parodies (Private Eye) – Satirical feature in Private Eye magazine
