= Karen Hellekson =

American scholar

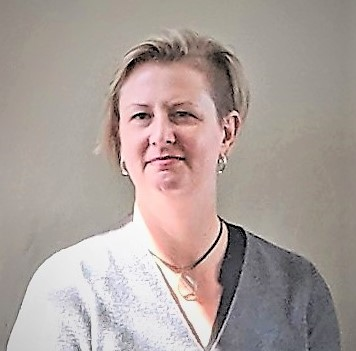
Hellekson in 2019

Karen L. Hellekson (born 1966) is an American author and scholar who researches science fiction and fan studies. In the field of science fiction, she is known for her research on the alternate history genre, the topic of her 2001 book, The Alternate History: Refiguring Historical Time, and has also published on the author Cordwainer Smith. In fan studies, she is known for her work on fan fiction and the culture of the fan community. She has co-edited two essay collections on fan fiction with Kristina Busse, and in 2008, co-founded the academic journal, Transformative Works and Cultures, also with Busse.

== Education and career ==
Hellekson has a BA in English from Gustavus Adolphus College, Minnesota (1988). Her MA is from the University of Kansas, with a dissertation on the science-fiction author Cordwainer Smith, entitled "Archipelagoes of stars: the science fiction of Cordwainer Smith" (1991). Her PhD (1998), also from the University of Kansas, was supervised by James Gunn; her thesis is entitled "Refiguring Historical Time: The Alternate History". Prior to completing her PhD, Hellekson left academia to work as a copy editor and independent scholar.

== Research and writing ==
=== Science fiction ===
Hellekson's first book, The Science Fiction of Cordwainer Smith (2001), derives from her MA thesis and incorporates material from a 1993 paper. Based on the archive of Cordwainer Smith materials at the University of Kansas, including drafts, reviews and unpublished material, the book reviews Smith's life and critiques several key stories as well as his novel, Norstrilia. A review in the journal Science Fiction Studies praises Hellekson's wide-ranging and detailed research and her "thoughtful" discussion. It criticizes her acceptance of prior critical thought, even when the material she has uncovered undermines accepted ideas about the author, and comments that her "sometimes scattered argument may be hard to navigate" for non-experts. In this book and her earlier paper, Hellekson classifies Smith as a humanist who views humanity as a "matter of an individual's heart or spirit" unrelated to "genetics, social status, or even intellect", emphasizing his "benevolent concern for humane behavior".

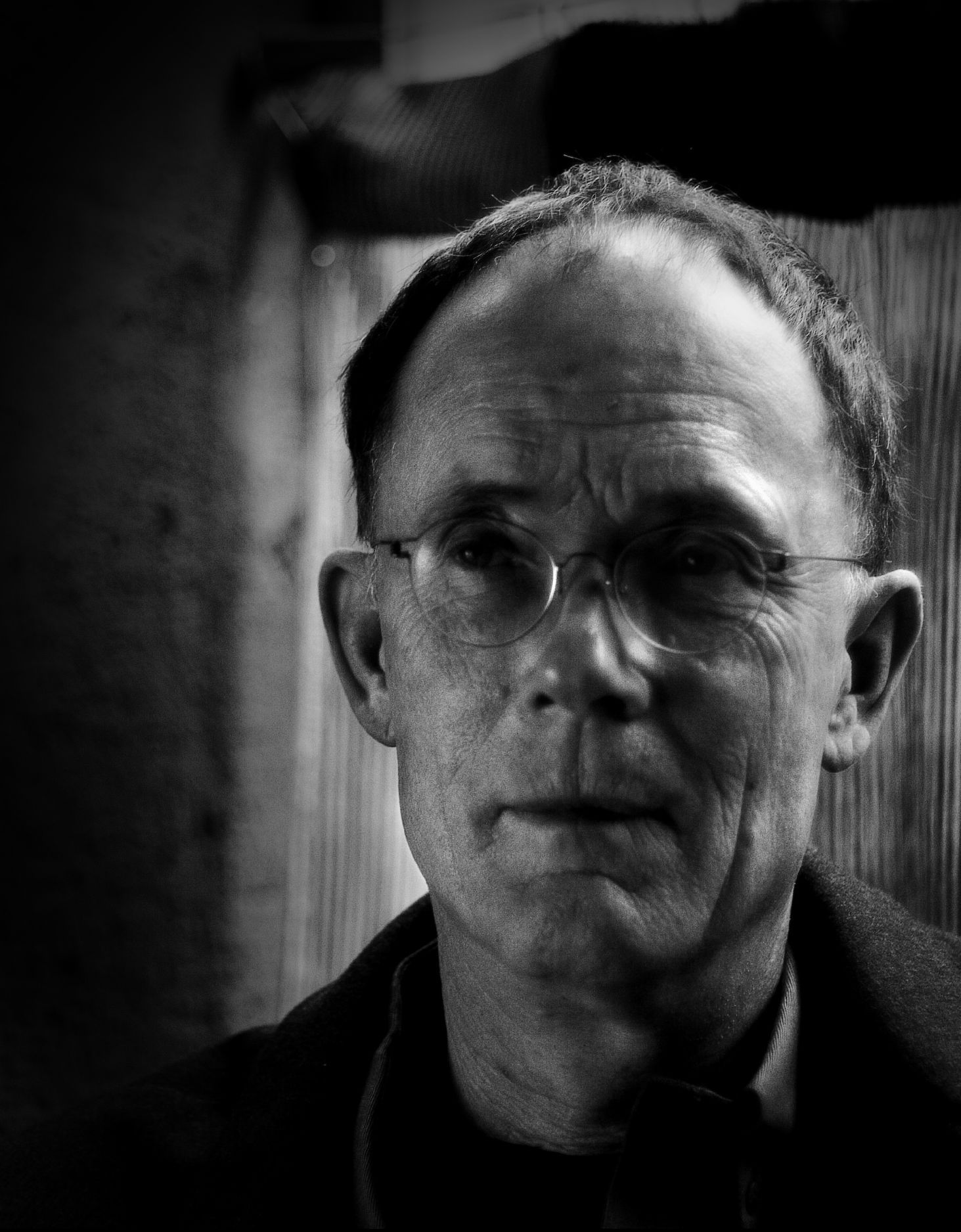
William Gibson collaborated with Bruce Sterling to write The Difference Engine, a Victorian-era alternate history which is one of the works Hellekson examines.

Her PhD thesis was published as The Alternate History: Refiguring Historical Time (2001), the earliest English-language book devoted to analyzing the popular genre of alternate history, (Note: An earlier book, Paul Alkon's Origins of Futuristic Fiction (1987), includes a discussion of alternative histories.) in which, for example, the Confederacy won the American Civil War. Hellekson considers the earliest Western examples of the genre to be Louis-Napoléon Geoffroy-Chateau's Napoléon et la Conquête du Monde (1836) and Isaac D'Israeli's Curiosities of Literature (1824), although Geoffrey Winthrop-Young highlights possible alternative histories by authors as early as Livy and Herodotus. The Alternate History discusses examples drawn from science fiction, including works by Brian Aldiss, Poul Anderson, Michael Crichton, Philip K. Dick, William Gibson/Bruce Sterling, Ward Moore and H. Beam Piper, and also reviews anthologies compiled by historians, which, Hellekson posits, attempt to curtail the freedom inherent in alternate history by excluding works considered too unlikely or "frivolous". Hellekson considers narrative strategies in the genre, reflecting on the opinions of Paul Ricoeur, Stephen Jay Gould and Hayden White. She underlines the fact that history represents not the actual past, but a narrative about the past in which "the historian is complicit in [the] storytelling, not an objective, impartial recorder of events". She notes that alternate histories "change the present by transforming the past". In a widely adopted taxonomy (Note: For example:) (first presented in an earlier article and responding to the work of William Joseph Collins), she divides the alternate history genre into three categories, depending on how the narrative relates to the divergence point from our reality: nexus stories, which "occur at the moment of the break" and include "time-travel-time-policing-stories and battle stories"; true alternate histories, which happen "after the break, sometimes a long time after"; and parallel worlds, in which "no break" occurs. Phillip E. Wegner describes the book as a "useful study" of the genre, while Kathleen Singles considers that it "lacks the comprehensiveness necessary to account for alternate history as a complex, interdisciplinary phenomenon". Hellekson contributed the chapter on alternate histories to The Routledge Companion to Science Fiction.

She also co-edited the book Practicing Science Fiction: Critical Essays on Writing, Reading and Teaching the Genre (with Craig B. Jacobsen, Patrick B. Sharp and Lisa Yaszek; 2010). She co-edited SFRA Review, the periodical of the Science Fiction Research Association (SFRA), with Jacobsen (1998–2000 and 2008–10). She won the 2002 Mary Kay Bray Award from the SFRA for her paper "Transforming the Subject: Humanity, The Body, and Post-Humanism".

=== Fan studies ===
Hellekson is known for her research into fan fiction, which she considers to have a long history: "fans have always been engaging with texts, often in transformative ways by literally scribbling in the margins, rewriting scenes, and crafting new endings". She has edited two collections of essays on the topic with Kristina Busse. Their first collaboration, Fan Fiction and Fan Communities in the Age of the Internet (2006), was conceived, in Hellekson and Busse's words, to "give voice to the many scholars we had met at conferences and online; create a volume that would start with the premise that academics were often fans and fans often academics and that that was okay; and permit conversations that did not always begin with introductory definitions but instead would assume a knowledgeable audience, thus raising the level of discourse." The book's four sections are each introduced by the editors, and additionally there is a 25-page introductory essay "Work in Progress" by Hellekson and Busse. Matt Hills, in a review for the journal Popular Communication, describes the collection as a "fine set of interventionist essays", which "smartly expands and develops ways of thinking about fandom and the cultural production, circulation, and reception of fan fiction". Alicia Verlager, in a detailed review for the Journal of the Fantastic in the Arts, praises the "wide-ranging and intelligent" essays but describes the book as "a challenging read" for the non-specialist, with the contents predominantly being "dense with academic theory". The editors aim to take a literary criticism approach involving close reading, rather than discussing fan fiction as a social or cultural phenomenon, as most earlier works had done; however, Bronwen Thomas considers that the essays "sacrifice depth for breadth and only rarely engage with specific narrative techniques".

In their second collection, The Fan Fiction Studies Reader (2014), Hellekson and Busse aim to "gather together in one place some of the foundational texts of the fan fiction studies corpus". Their selections are described as "vital" by the reviewer Anne Kustritz, who considers the editors to have been largely successful in building a fan-studies canon, which she explains as "defining a relatively new field's identity, negotiating its limits, and setting the agenda for future research ... centralizing an often-scattered sub-discipline and assembling a shared base through which scholars working in diverse disciplines and methods can have a common language and conversation." Kustritz criticizes the exclusion of quantitative studies including quantitative psychology, while Lesley Willard notes that in their focus on feminist interpretations, the chosen essays "sidestep issues of race, class, and intersectionality", and Fiona N. Cheuk highlights the absence of any discussion of disability. The editors deliberately include only those texts that discuss works based on Western media. Cheuk takes issue with this choice, drawing attention to the prevalence of fanworks for non-western media sources such as Japanese anime and manga, and concluding that the exclusion "seems to contradict the diversity and expansiveness of the fan fiction works and communities", leading to a "metanarrative of absence, placelessness, estrangement, and unbelonging for non-western narratives in western academic traditions". The selection of reprints includes 1980s and 1990s extracts from the offline and early-Internet periods, representing the work of the earliest scholars in the field, including Henry Jenkins, Camille Bacon-Smith and Constance Penley; Kustritz characterizes some of these "classic" texts as "somewhat quaint" but adds that they give a "necessary grounding". She describes the editors' introductory contextualizing material as valuable and well balanced, and praises the volume's themed organization for bringing the older texts into conversation with the more modern ones. Willard also praises the "comprehensive" introductory material; she considers the volume's broadening of focus at the end to include works other than fan fiction to be "somewhat jarring".

Hellekson has published on topics relating to the fan community. Her highest-cited research article (Note: According to a search on Google Scholar, it had 236 citations as of January 31, 2021.) is on gift culture in online fandom, in which she posits that "giving, receiving, and reciprocating are the three central tenets of participation in online media fandom". A response from Abigail De Kosnik counters that female fans writing fan fiction without financial compensation "risk institutionalizing a lack of compensation for all women that practice this art in the future." Hellekson has also written on the attempted monetization of fan fiction by the short-lived FanLib archive, and has compared the fan-run Archive of Our Own with various commercial sites. She wrote the chapter "Fandom and Fan Culture" for The Cambridge Companion to American Science Fiction. With Busse, she co-founded the online academic journal Transformative Works and Cultures in 2008 and continued to act as its co-editor until 2022. It covers "popular media, fan communities, and transformative works" and is the earliest of two extant journals in the field of fan studies, the other being the Journal of Fandom Studies.

== Selected publications ==
Authored books

- Karen Hellekson (2001), The Alternate History: Refiguring Historical Time, Kent State University Press, ISBN 9780873386838
- Karen Hellekson (2001), The Science Fiction of Cordwainer Smith, McFarland, ISBN 9780786411498

Edited books

- Karen Hellekson; Kristina Busse, eds. (2014), The Fan Fiction Studies Reader, University of Iowa Press, ISBN 9781609382278
- Karen Hellekson; Craig B. Jacobsen; Patrick B. Sharp; Lisa Yaszek, eds. (2010), Practicing Science Fiction: Critical Essays on Writing, Reading and Teaching the Genre, McFarland, ISBN 9780786447930
- Karen Hellekson; Kristina Busse, eds. (2006), Fan Fiction and Fan Communities in the Age of the Internet, McFarland, ISBN 9780786426409

Research articles

Hellekson's highest-cited research papers and book chapters (in Google Scholar, as of January 31, 2021):

- Kristina Busse; Karen Hellekson (2012), "Identity, Ethics, and Fan Privacy", in Katherine Larsen (ed.), Fan Culture: Theory/Practice, Cambridge Scholars Publishing, ISBN 9781443838627
- Karen Hellekson (2009), "A Fannish Field of Value: Online Fan Gift Culture", Cinema Journal, 48 (4): 113–118, doi:10.1353/cj.0.0140, JSTOR 25619733
