= FanFiction.Net =

US fan fiction website

- Screenshot Screenshot of homepage on January 18, 2016
- Website type: Fan fiction archive
- Owner: Xing Li
- Creator: Xing Li
- Revenue: N/A
- Website: www.fanfiction.net
- IPv6 support: Yes
- Registration: Optional
- Launched: October 15, 1998; 28 years ago
- Current status: Active

FanFiction.Net (often abbreviated as FF.net or FFN) is an automated fan fiction archive site. It was introduced in 1998 by software designer Xing Li and had over 12 million registered users in 2023.

== Site navigation and usage ==
The mobile (m.fanfiction.net) site is split into nine main Fictional Crossover categories, with each category of anime, books, cartoons, comics, games, misc. (miscellaneous), movies, plays (includes musicals), and TV populated with names of established fictional properties; clicking or tapping on one of these titles brings you to a second page of titles, populated with fictional crossovers between the first title chosen and any of the titles chosen from the second page. For instance, choosing "comics" followed by "Gold Digger" followed by "Ranma" will bring the reader to a selection of twelve crossover fanfiction selections of Ranma and Gold Digger.

The desktop version of the site (www.fanfiction.net) is split into six categories on the main page: anime/manga, books, cartoons, misc., movies and plays, with a drop-down "Browse" component on the top of the page providing access to the full list of the nine categories listed above in the mobile section, available to browse as full lists of each of the original fictional properties only, as well as an additional list of the mine categories with crossover fanfiction (navigable as described above).

The desktop version of the page is far, far more populated with original property titles than the mobile (crossover-only) version of the page, as of late 2026, although the gross majority of the properties in the crossover section on the desktop site lead to empty results; when seeking crossover fanfiction, the mobile site is more reliable. For non-crossover stories, many thousands of pages exist; for instance, games -> RF Online has 35 stories, all in non-English; games -> Five Nights at Freddy's has over 8,700 fanfic stories; plays -> Dr. Horrible's Sing-Along Blog has 416 entries; TV -> The Walking Dead has almost 20,000 stories; and movies -> High School Musical has over 17,700 fanfics to read.

The forums section appears to have the same community content on both the mobile and the desktop sites.

Users who complete the free registration process can submit their own fan fiction, maintain a user profile, review other stories, apply for a beta reader position, contact each other via private messages, and maintain a list of favorite stories and authors. There are centralized communities and forums. In lieu of signing up with a new account, the website allows users to use their Google, Facebook, or Twitter accounts. The site also owns a Twitter account called FictionPress where users of the website are updated on changes and improvements made.

== History ==
Xing Li, a software developer from Alhambra, California, created FanFiction.Net in 1998. Created by Xing Li as a school project, the site was founded as a non-profit repository for fan-created stories that revolved around characters from popular literature, films, television, anime, and video games. Registration was open to all people who said they were over 18. By 2002, over 118,000 people were registered (the age limit has since been lowered to age 13); at that time, one-third of the registrants self-identified as 18 or younger, and 80% were female.

== Features ==
Fanfiction.net provides a number of options that login users can use to create stories and interact with both fans and fellow authors.

=== Private messaging ===
This feature is separated into two categories: Inbox and Outbox. Authors may receive a private message (PM) from anyone who has an affiliated account. In addition to this, there is no report button affiliated with this feature. Fortunately, blocking a user stops them from leaving PMs and reviews. There is also a way to disable private messaging. By clicking on account settings, under Account Options, the author may choose to either accept or decline PMs. Additionally, the site has a feature that filters basic profanity for both incoming reviews and PM messages.

=== Forums ===
The author can create up to 10 forums for personal use and can optionally link a forum to a specific category. The site asks that forums must adhere to the rules that both complies to terms and service and creates a nontoxic environment for other users. The rules are:

1. Forums are not to be used to post stories.
2. All discussions, language and content, must be suitable for teens.
3. The owner/moderator(s) of this forum is solely responsible for content posted within this area.

=== Polls ===
Authors may create up to 25 polls for personal use. This feature is primarily used to discuss topics within a forum of one's fandom of primary interest. All votes are confidential and protected. Neither the poll creator nor the voters are able to view the individual votes or voters. Only the total number of voters are revealed. The author has the option to enable "blind" polls. In a blind poll, live poll results are not accessible to the voters. Poll result is only available to the public when the poll has been closed.

=== Reader feedback ===
Readers can interact with the FanFiction.Net content in various ways. If the reader likes a story and its author, they can favorite both the story and its author. Favorites are similar to likes, hearts or Archive of Our Own's kudos. Favorite stories and authors are displayed on a user's public profile page at the very bottom. A reader can also follow a story or its author. When a reader follows a story, they receive email notifications whenever that story is updated. When a reader follows an author, they receive email updates whenever the author updates any of their stories or publishes a new one. Readers can also leave reviews after reading stories, most of which were positive as of 2001. While reviews can be left by those without accounts, it is an option for all writers on the site to moderate "anonymous reviews", made by those who are not signed into an account. Reviews left by signed-in users cannot be moderated or disabled. FanFiction.Net does not operate a screening or editorial board.

=== Most popular sections ===
As of September 8, 2026, the top 20 fandoms (i.e., the fandoms with the most stories submitted) on FanFiction.Net are (the figures are rounded to nearest thousand):

Rank	Fandom	Category	No. of stories
1	Harry Potter	Books	852K
2	Naruto	Anime/Manga	444K
3	Twilight	Books	223K
4	Supernatural	TV shows	127K
5	Inuyasha	Anime/Manga	122K
6	Hetalia: Axis Powers	Anime/Manga	116K
7	Glee	TV shows	107K
8	Pokémon	Games	107K
9	Bleach	Anime/Manga	85.3K
10	Percy Jackson and the Olympians	Books	81.2K
11	Doctor Who	TV shows	76.7K
12	Kingdom Hearts	Games	74.1K
13	Fairy Tail	Anime/Manga	69.6K
14	Yu-Gi-Oh!	Anime/Manga	68.1K
15	Star Wars	Movies	61.3K
16	Sherlock	TV shows	59.1K
17	Lord of the Rings	Books	58.1K
18	Dragon Ball Z	Anime/Manga	54.9K
19	Once Upon a Time	TV shows	53.4K
20	Avengers	Movies	52.4K

=== Community ===
Authors can create or edit a community, which are essentially custom archives organized by active members containing hand-picked stories from community volunteers. If an author creates a new community, they will be able to hire and manage a group of community staff members who will moderate entries to the community archive. The author can hire and delete any staff or story in the community while also checking its statistics, which details how popular their community is.

=== Traffic stats ===
This feature allows the author to monitor how often their stories, profile, and community are being visited by readers. The author can filter the month they would like to view and even see a breakdown of the number of views and visitors they receive from a different country of origin.

== Site content ==
The stories published to the site can be about new and old existing works. By 2001, almost 100,000 stories were posted on the website. Steven Savage, a programmer who wrote a column for FanFiction.Net, described it as "the adult version of when kids play at being TV characters" and that the content posted on the website serves as examples for "when people really care about something". FanFiction.Net has since become the largest online repository for fan-created works.

FanFiction.Net also hosts some of the longest works of fiction ever written. The Subspace Emissary's Worlds Conquest, a Super Smash Bros. fan fiction written by FanFiction.Net user AuraChannelerChris, gained media attention for its length of over four million words at the time of notice, more than three times as long as In Search of Lost Time written by Marcel Proust. Another fan fiction, this one about The Loud House, was 16 million words long by 2022 and over 30 million upon completion, claimed by The Spectator Australia to be "the longest fiction work in the history of the world".

=== Story publishing ===
FanFiction.Net has nine categories for various fandoms: Anime/Manga, Books, Cartoons, Comics, Games, Miscellaneous, Movies, Plays/Musicals, and TV shows. Stories on the site can be published as either "Fanfiction" with only one assigned sub-category, or as a "Crossover" with only two sub-categories. Excluding crossovers and as of July 2023, the top fandoms on the site are Harry Potter, Naruto, and Twilight.

Writers may upload their stories to the site and must assign them a sub-category, language, and content rating. FanFiction.Net uses the content rating system from FictionRatings.com. This system contains the ratings of K, K+, T, M and MA. The MA rating and explicit violent or sexual themes are forbidden. The ratings are no longer done on the MPAA system, due to cease-and-desist demands from the Motion Picture Association of America in 2005. A list of explanations for the rating system currently employed is available from the drop-down rating menu in each of the individual archives on the site. The MA (18+) rating is not permitted on this site. A short K-rated summary is also required for a story to be published. While not required, the website recommends authors upload a cover image to their story.

=== Fanfiction ratings ===
The scale for ratings on Fanfiction.Net is:

- K: it is the equivalent of a G rating, with a general lack of violence or adult themes. Fanfics with this rating are suited for all ages, and are generally recommended from ages 5 and up.
- K+: it is the equivalent of a PG rating, with some violence or strong language justified by the context, with content that may not be suitable to young children. Fanfics with this rating are recommended from ages 9 and up.
- T: it is the equivalent of a PG-13 rating, with more detailed violence and a higher presence of mature themes, though nothing too explicit. Fanfics with this rating generally have content not recommended for children under 13.
- M: it is the equivalent of a R rating, with more explicit adult content and themes, frequent coarse language, drug use and references to sexual violence. Fanfics with this ratings have content that is not suitable for children under 16.
- MA: it is the equivalent of an NC-17 rating, not suitable for minors. Fanfics with this ratings have explicit adult content, including sexual content. As of 2005, fanfics with these ratings are forbidden.

== Banned content ==
Through the years after its conception, FanFiction.Net instituted several policy changes as it grew in size and popularity. As a result, it placed restrictions on the types of fan works that could be posted on the site.

=== Copyright and trademark infringement ===
Since the site's founding, several professional authors and producers have asked that stories based on their copyrighted or trademarked works be removed, including Anne Rice, P. N. Elrod, Archie Comics, Dennis L. McKiernan, Irene Radford, J.R. Ward, Laurell K. Hamilton, Nora Roberts, Raymond E. Feist, Robin Hobb, Robin McKinley, and Terry Goodkind.

In addition, stories based on real-life celebrities were disallowed around 2003. Fan fiction based on professional wrestling, however, is still allowed, being the number one fandom in the "Miscellaneous" category.

=== Explicit fiction ===
On September 12, 2002, FanFiction.Net banned material that was rated NC-17, and removed it on October 12, 2002. This was done because of a high volume of complaints related to certain adult stories. Prior to the new policy, the site would use a pop-up to prompt readers to say whether they were over 17 or not, but since then, the site has relied on its users to report stories that are inappropriately rated. Story titles and summaries must be rated K.

FanFiction.Net experienced a temporary shutdown for two days in July 2024 due to a policy update regarding explicit content and depictions of child abuse.

=== CYOA (choose your own adventure) and reader-insertion fiction ===
Choose-your-own-adventure and reader-insertion fanfiction have both been banned since 2005, and the site removed all material that had the potential of inserting the reader into a fanfiction. Under the heading of "Entries not allowed", item #5 says: "Any form of interactive entry: choose your adventure, second person/you based, Q&As, etc."

=== Songfics ===
In 2005, FanFiction.Net banned "songfics", a type of fanfiction which frequently contains copyrighted song lyrics. Public domain lyrics (such as those to "Amazing Grace") or lyrics written by the author of the fan fiction are allowed.

=== Lists ===
The official FanFiction.Net Content Guideline states that lists fall under the line of non-stories, along with bloopers, polls, previews, challenges, author notes, etc., thus they are not allowed on the site.

== Reception ==
At first, FanFiction.Net's server was mainly accessible only in the West, and worked poorly, if at all, in other parts of the world. In late 2006, announcements were made of special web links designed for Europe and Asia. These were supposed to give other areas of the world a significant boost in server speed on the website. In 2007, all three web links were combined under one worldwide link. In an announcement on the home page, it was stated that the site would go global that year. As of October 2023, 44% of FanFiction.net users are from the United States of America with the second highest traffic area being the United Kingdom with approximately 6% of the users.

According to Hitwise, as of August 2007 FanFiction.Net comprised 34.7% of all traffic directed to sites in the Entertainment, Books and Writing category. For the week ending August 25, 2007, the site was ranked 159 out of over 1 million websites in terms of hits.

While the site is primarily used for recreational use, researches have been considering bringing fan fiction use into classrooms. Fanfiction.net provides many avenues of communication for its users, making it a primary subject of consideration. Due to the site's demographics leaning primarily towards women, researchers have also considered fan fiction as an online organization that could potentially be utilized for feminist thought and discussion. However, ultimately, in this current age, online relations have become more prevalent, and the manners of how interaction influences creative thought has been a significant role of Fanfiction.net's user activity from when it was conceived to now.

== FictionPress.com ==
FictionPress.com
- Website type: Fiction archive
- Owner: Xing Li
- Creator: Xing Li
- Website: www.fictionpress.com
- Commercial: Yes
- Registration: Optional
- Current status: Online

FanFiction.Net's sister site, FictionPress.com, contains over 1 million original stories, poems, and plays. The site has a similar format and rules to FanFiction.Net, except that no fan fiction is allowed.

== See also ==
- Wattpad
- Archive of Our Own (Organization for Transformative Works)
- DeviantArt
- LiveJournal
- Pixiv
- Fimfiction
- My Little Pony: Friendship Is Magic fan fiction
