= Mary Kay Bray Award =

The Mary Kay Bray Award is given by the Science Fiction Research Association for the best essay, interview, or extended review to appear in the SFRA Review in a given year.

Previous winners include:

- 2002 - Karen Hellekson, "Transforming the Subject: Humanity, the Body, and Posthumanism" (Mar/Apr 2003)
- 2003 - Farah Mendlesohn, Review of The Years of Rice and Salt (ISBN 0-553-58007-8) by Kim Stanley Robinson
- 2004 - Bruce A. Beatie, Review of L. Frank Baum, Creator of Oz (ISBN 0-312-30174-X) by Katharine M. Rogers (Apr/May/Jun 2004)
- 2005 - Thomas J. Morrissey, Review of The Shore of Women (ISBN 978-1932100365) by Pamela Sargent (Jan/Feb/Mar 2005)
- 2006 - Ed Carmien, Review of The Space Opera Renaissance (ISBN 978-0765306180) edited by David G. Hartwell and Kathryn Cramer (Jul/Aug/Sep 2006)
- 2007 - Jason W. Ellis, Reviews of Starship Troopers (ISBN 978-0441014101) by Robert Heinlein (April/May/June 2007) and Brasyl (ISBN 978-1591025436) by Ian McDonald (July/Aug/Sept 2007)
- 2008 - Sandor Klapcsik, Rewired (Spring 2008)
- 2009 - Ritch Calvin, "Mundane SF 101" (Summer 2009).
- 2010 - Alfredo Suppia, "Southern Portable Panic: Federico Álvarez’s Ataque de Pánico!" (Spring 2010)
