= Fan labor =

Activities done by fans of a work

Fan labor, also called fan works, are the creative activities engaged in by fans, primarily those of various media properties or musical groups. These activities can include creation of written works (fiction, fan fiction and review literature), visual or computer-assisted art, films and videos, animations, games, music, or applied arts and costuming.

In the fandom subgroups science fiction fandom and media fandom, fan labor activities may be termed fanac (from "fannish activities"), a term that also includes non-creative activities such as managing traditional science fiction fanzines (i.e., not primarily devoted to fan fiction), and the organization and maintenance of science fiction conventions and science fiction clubs.

A more general and internet focused form of "fan work" is user-generated content, which became popular with the Web 2.0, often also a form of virtual volunteering.

== Categories of activities ==
=== Literary arts ===
Fan fiction has existed since the 17th century. They are literary works produced by fans of a given media property, rather than the original creator. They may expand on an original story line, character relationship, or situations and entities that were originally mentioned in the original author's work. Works of fan fiction are usually unauthorized by the original work's owner, creator, or publisher.

Fandom analytics is a practice that is focused on the analysis of fan works in order to discuss and forecast trends and variations within and across fandoms.

=== Traditional visual arts ===
Fan art is artwork based on a character, costume, item, or story that was created by someone other than the artist. Usually, it refers to fan labor artworks by amateur and unpaid artists. In addition to traditional paintings and drawings, fan artists may also create web banners, avatars, or web-based animations, as well as photo collages, posters, and artistic representation of movie/show/book quotes.

=== Computer-aided visual arts ===
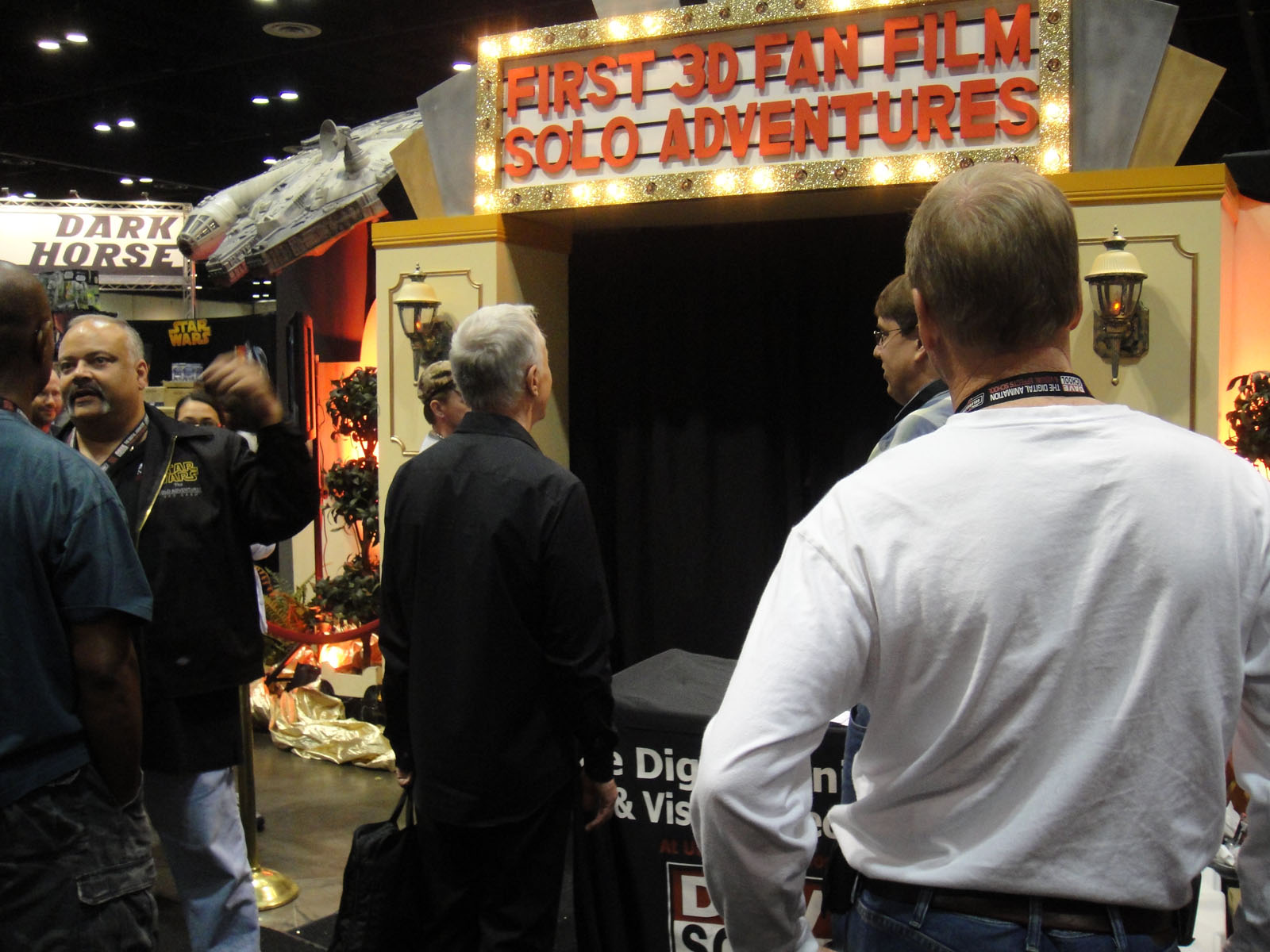
A booth screening a Star Wars fan film at a convention

A fan film is a film or video inspired by a media source, created by fans rather than by the source's copyright holders or creators. Fan films vary may vary in length.

Fanvids are music videos made by remixing existing media from TV shows or movies.

Fangames are video games that are made based on existing video games from video game publishers by its fans.

Fans of video games have been creating machinima since 1996. Machinima creators use computer game engines to create "actors" and create scenarios for them to perform in, using the physics and character generation tools of the game. The scripts, as performed by the computer-generated characters, are recorded and distributed to viewers online.

Reanimated collaborations involve each fan animating a shot of an existing film in their own unique style. The clips are then stitched together to produce a collaborative tribute, sometimes with over 500 animators on a single film. Reanimated projects have been produced in honor of Looney Tunes, SpongeBob, The Simpsons, Kirby, and Zelda CDi, among others. Participants generally expect little or no profit.

Fan labor in the software domain, especially for video games, exists also in the form of fan patches, fan translations, mods, fan-made remakes, server emulators and source ports.

=== Musical arts ===
Some fandoms are known to produce music as a form of fan labor that is usually classified as filk. Filking is often done in small groups at conventions, often late at night after other official convention programming has ended for the day; additionally, there are now dedicated filk conventions in Canada, England, Germany, and the United States. The brony fandom has developed a vast musical subculture, often referred to as brony music.

== Legal issues ==
Most fan labor products are derivative works, meaning they are creative additions or modifications to an existing copyrighted work, or they are original creations which are inspired by a specific copyrighted work. Some or all of these works may fall into the legal category of transformative works (such as a parody of the original), which are protected as fair use under U.S. copyright law.

== See also ==
- Doujinshi
- Fan art
- Fan film
- Fan patch
- Fan translation
- Fangame
- Fansub
- Free software movement—similar subculture based around free labor with some overlaps with fan labor
- Remix culture
- Street team

== Works cited ==
- Appadurai, Arjun (1986) The social life of things: Commodities in cultural perspective. Cambridge: Cambridge University Press.
- Brown, Stephen (2007) "Harry Potter and the Fandom Menace". In Consumer Tribes, B. Cova, R.V. Kozinets and A. Shankar, eds. pp. 177–193. Oxford, Elsevier.
- Clerc, Susan (2002) Who Owns Our Culture? The Battle Over the Internet, Copyright, Media Fandom, and Everyday Uses of the Cultural Commons. Dissertation, Bowling Green State University. Ann Arbor, MI: ProQuest Information and Learning Co.
- Coppa, Francesca (2007) "A Brief History of Media Fandom". In Fan Fiction and Fan Communities in the Age of the Internet, K. Hellekson and K. Busse, eds. pp. 5–32. London, McFarland.
- Cova, Bernard, Robert V. Kozinets and Avi Shankar (2007) Consumer Tribes. Oxford, Elsevier.
- De Kosnik, Abigail (2009) Should Fan Fiction Be Free?. In Cinema Journal 48:118 (2009).
- Deuze, Mark (2007) Media Work. Cambridge, Polity Press.
- Fiske, John (1992) "The Cultural Economy of Fandom". In The Adoring Audience, Lisa A. Lewis, ed. pp. 30–49. London, Routledge.
- Gray, Jonathan, Cornel Sandvoss and C. Lee Harrington (2007) Fandom: Identities and Communities in a Mediated World. New York, New York University Press.
- Hellekson, Karen and Kristina Busse (2006) "Introduction: Work in Progress". In Fan Fiction and Fan Communities in the Age of the Internet, K. Hellekson and K. Busse, eds. pp. 5–32. London, McFarland.
- Helms, Mary W. (1998)"Tangible Durability". In Access to Origins: Affines, Ancestors, and Aristocrats. M.W. Helms, ed. pp. 164–173. Austin: University of Texas Press.
- Isaac, Barry L. (1993) "Retrospective on the Formalist-Substantivist Debate". Research in Economic Anthropology 14:213–233.
- Jenkins, Henry (2007a) Fans, Bloggers, and Gamers: Exploring Participatory Culture. New York, New York University Press.
- Jenkins, Henry (2007b) "Afterword: The Future of Fandom".In Fandom: Identities and Communities in a Mediated World. J. Gray, C. Sandvoss and C.L. Harrington, eds. pp. 357–364. New York, New York University Press.
- Jenkins, Henry (2006) Convergence Culture: Where Old and New Media Collide. New York, New York University Press.
- Keen, Andrew (2007) The Cult of the Amateur: How Today's Internet is Killing Our Culture. New York, Doubleday.
- Kozinets, Robert V. (2007) "Inno-tribes: Star Trek as wikimedia". In Consumer Tribes, B. Cova, R.V. Kozinets and A. Shankar, eds. pp. 177–193. Oxford, Elsevier.
- Lowood, Henry (2006). "High-performance play: The making of machinima". Journal of Media Practice. 7 (1): 25–42. doi:10.1386/jmpr.7.1.25/1. S2CID 191359937.
- Mauss, Marcel (1990) The Gift: The Form and Reason for Exchange in Archaic Societies. W.D. Halls, transl. London: Routledge.
- MacDonald, Heidi (2006) "Star Wars POD Fan Fiction Flap". in Publishers Weekly; May 1, 2006, 253, 18. p. 6.
- Polanyi, Karl (1957) "The Economy as Instituted Process". In Trade and market in the Early Empires: Economies in History and Theory. C.M.A. K. Polanyi, H.W. Pearson, ed. pp. 243–270. Glencoe, Illinois: The Free Press.
- Thorne, Scott and Gordon C. Bruner (2006) "An exploratory investigation of the characteristics of consumer fanaticism". Qualitative Market Research; 2006; 9, 1. p. 51.
- Thorsby, David (2001) "Introduction". In Economics and Culture. pp. 1–18. Cambridge, UK: Cambridge University Press.
- Tushnet, Rebecca (2004) "Copy This Essay: How Fair Use Doctrine Harms Free Speech and How Copying Serves It". In The Yale Law Journal. 114(3):535–590. JSTOR 4135692.
- Tushnet, Rebecca (2007) "http://scholarship.law.duke.edu/cgi/viewcontent.cgi?article=1424&context=lcp Payment in Credit: Copyright Law and Subcultural Creativity". In Law & Contemporary Problems. 70:135–174.
- Wells, E. Christian and Karla Davis-Salazar (2007) "Mesoamerican Ritual Economy: Materialization as Ritual and Economic Process". In Mesoamerican Ritual Economy: Archaeological and Ethnological Perspectives, E. C. Wells and K. L. Davis-Salazar, eds. pp. 1–26. Boulder, University Press of Colorado.
- Wilk, Richard R. and Lisa C. Cliggett (2007) Economies and Cultures: Foundations of Economic Anthropology. Boulder, Colorado: Westview Press.
- Woo, Jisuk (2004) "Redefining the 'Transformative Use' of Copyrighted Works: Toward a Fair Use Standard in the Digital Environment". In Hastings Communications and Law Journal. Retrieved from Lexis-Nexis service, University of South Florida Library.
