= Fan art =

Artwork featuring aspects of a work of fiction created by a fan

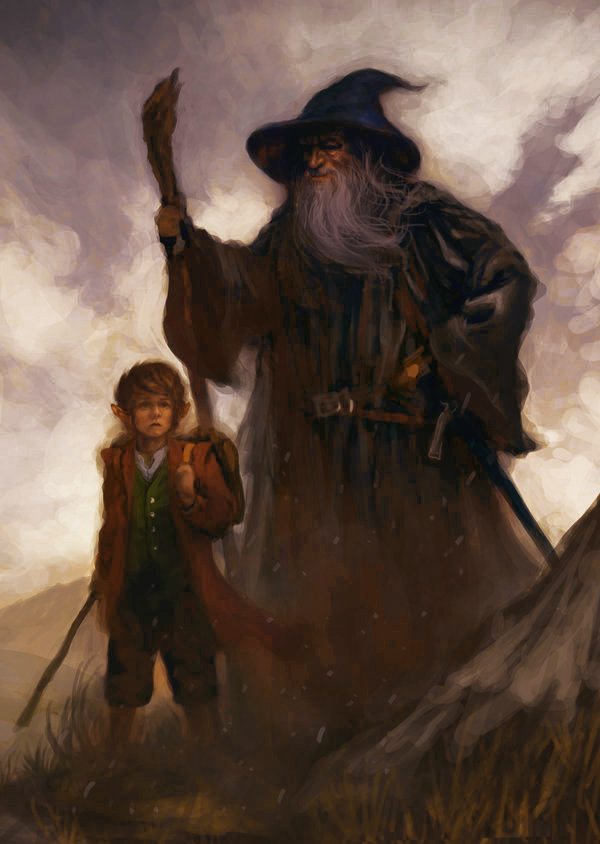
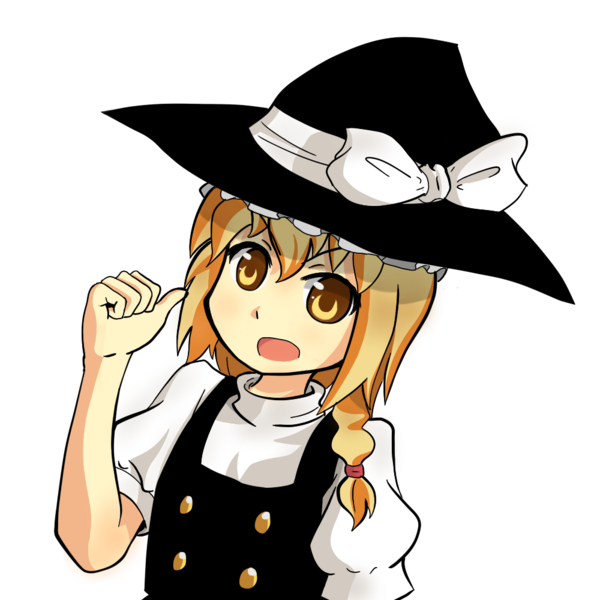
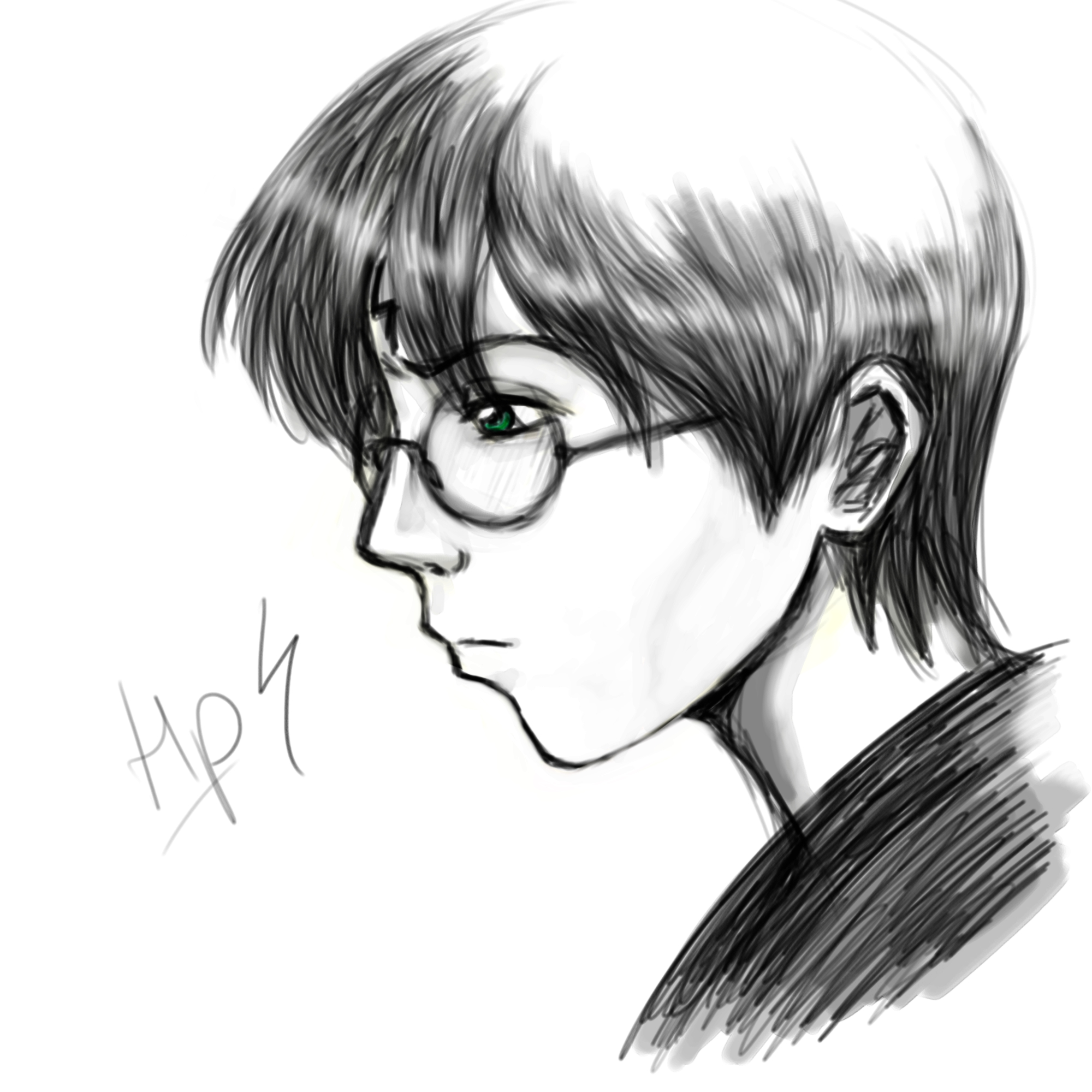
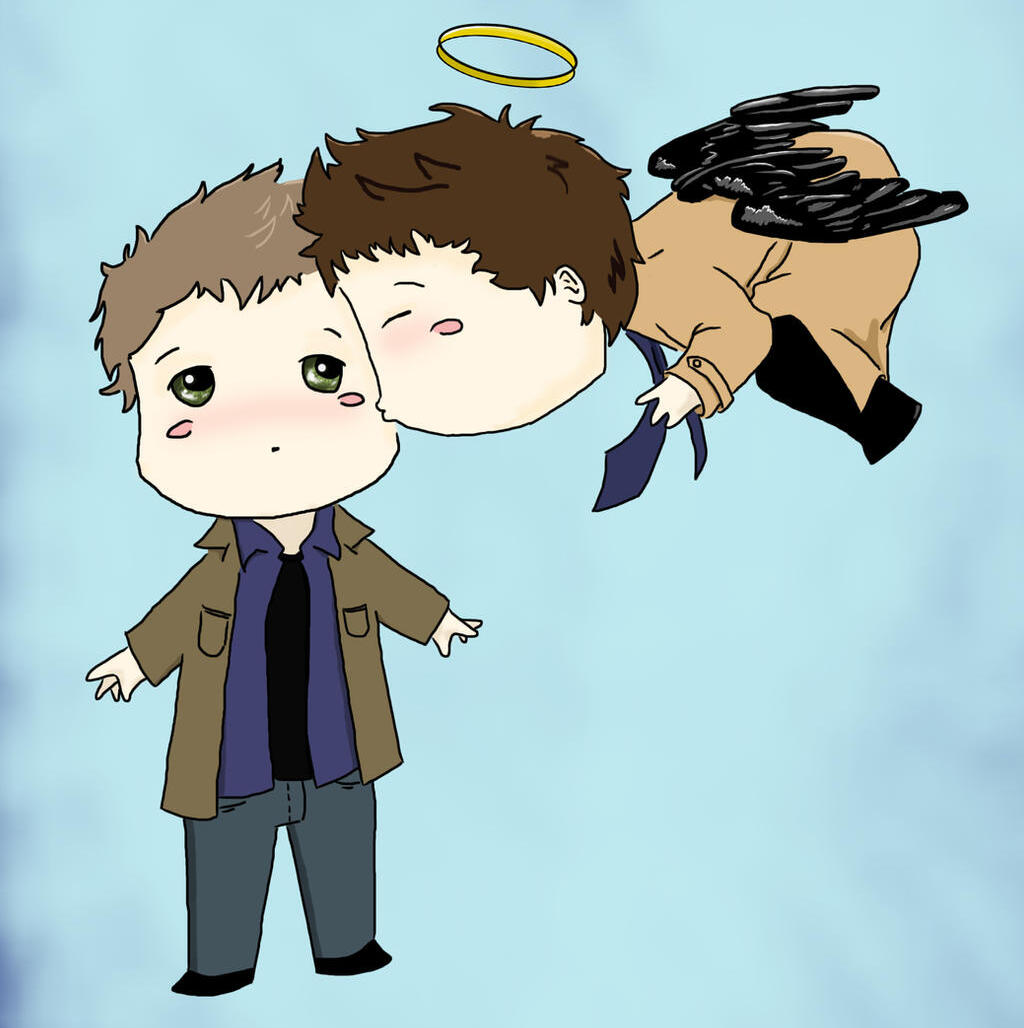
Various works of fan art (clockwise from upper left): Bilbo Baggins and Gandalf from The Lord of the Rings · Marisa Kirisame from Touhou Project · Dean Winchester and Castiel from Supernatural · Harry Potter from Harry Potter

Fan art or fanart is artwork created by fans of a work of fiction or celebrity depicting events, character, or other aspect of the work. As fan labor, fan art refers to artworks that are not created, commissioned, nor endorsed by the creators of the work from which the fan art derives.

A different, older meaning of the term is used in science fiction fandom, where fan art traditionally describes original (rather than derivative) artwork related to science fiction or fantasy, created by fan artists, and appearing in low- or non-paying publications such as semiprozines or fanzines, and in the art shows of science fiction conventions. The Hugo Award for Best Fan Artist has been given each year since 1967 to artists who create such works. Like the term fan fiction (although to a lesser extent), this traditional meaning is now sometimes confused with the more recent usage described above.

== Forms ==
Fan art can take many forms. In addition to traditional paintings, drawings, and digital art, fan artists may also create conceptual works, sculptures, video art, livestreams, web banners, avatars, graphic designs, web-based animations, photo collages, and posters, Fan art includes artistic representations of pre-existing characters both in new contexts and in contexts that are keeping with the original work.

The broad availability of digital image processing and the Internet, as well as text-to-image generators, has greatly increased the scope and potential reach of fan art. American TV producer Bryan Konietzko wrote in 2013:

"I remember back in the Avatar days [2005–2008]... the typical fanart we would get would be a charming, childish crayon drawing stuffed in an envelope. Nowadays on Korra [2012–2014], I take a skewed screenshot with my phone, post it, and shortly thereafter someone un-skews it, crops it, separates the character levels, clones the background, 'Ken Burns' it with a multilevel slide, animates the characters blinking and talking, tints it, and makes a GIF out of it, that I then see on the same phone with which I took the original picture. Times they are a-changin'..."

Rule 34, the idea that everything is represented in internet pornography, commonly takes the form of erotic fan art.

Fan art can also serve as cultural commentary or criticism, presenting established characters in new situations or contexts which would never appear in canon. This allows fans and artists to explore deeper or alternate meanings, as well as fan theories, about their favorite media.

== Creation and influence ==
=== Creative motivation ===
Fan artists derive motivation to create from their love of an original work of art and are able to use aspects of the work as reference material to make their art without having to create their own original work from scratch. The use of another work's existing features allow fan artists to create new artistic interpretations of characters, settings, or story beats from the original work and speculate on these features in ways that may not have originally been elaborated on in the original work.

Because fan art relies on an already existing work of art, the creation of fan art is commonly used by novice artists as a way to begin learning how to create in their medium of choice. In a 2009 study surveying self-identified fan artists, researcher Marjorie Cohee Manifold writes:

"Over 79 per cent of the respondents acknowledged that practicing exact copies (i.e. ‘canonical’ representations) of source material was critical to learning fanart drawing. The necessity of getting a character’s appearance right, in order that it be recognized by other fans, compelled fanartists to attend to the difficult technical skills of drawing."

=== Influence in fandom culture ===
Fan art may carry an interpretation of an aspect of the work that differs from how the aspect was depicted in the original. As a result, fan art is capable of generating discussion among other fans surrounding the fan artist's new interpretation. A character from the original work, for example, may have a specific trait emphasized in fan art in a way the original did not explicitly depict. Similarly, relationships between characters from the original may be depicted through fan art in alternative ways that allows the artist to further explore how these characters might act around each other in new contexts, commonly referred to as shipping.

Discourse surrounding fan art and how the contents of the new work relate back to the original influences culture surrounding the fandom involving the fan art. New ideas are exchanged, existing ideas are further elaborated on or refuted, and readings of the original text depicted through fan art are discussed, in turn, influencing how the culture surrounding a fandom interacts with the original work.

== Copyright ==
Fan art using settings and characters from a previously created work could be considered a derivative work, which would place control of the copyright with the owner of that original work by the Berne Convention. This gives rights holders the option to take down some fan works on the basis of infringement.

Nevertheless, many rights holders have directly acknowledged and allowed nonprofit fan works, with some even encouraging them on social media. Anime distributor Funimation officially stated that while fan-works could be legally considered unauthorized reproductions under copyright law in the United States, they choose to not enforce its copyright rights against fan-works sold in artist booths within anime conventions because of how the fan-works can showcase the original works.

Some companies also create guidelines on what fan works they allow. Cygames disallowed more explicit fan art of characters from Umamusume due to the characters being based on real-world racehorses. Outside of guidelines established by rights holders, numerous jurisdictions have exemptions to copyright via the "three-step" test of the Berne Convention.

=== Fair Use ===
American copyright law allows for the production, display and distribution of derivative works if they fall under a fair use exemption, 17 U.S.C. § 107. Courts look at multiple factors when evaluating fair use, with no one factor dispositive alone. A multipronged rubric for this decision includes the amount and substantiality appropriated, the transformative nature of the derivative work, whether the derivative work was done for educational or non-commercial use, and the economic effect that the derivative work imposes on the copyright holder's ability to make and exploit their own derivative works.

The Organization for Transformative Works (OTW) argued the legality of non-profit fan works under the fair use doctrine, as it is a creative, transformative process that does not provide commercial gain. Some fan works could be considered parody, and American courts have granted fair use protection. This has not been explicitly adjudicated with fan art, however.

=== Fair Dealing and Enumerated Copyright Exceptions ===
Many jurisdictions in the Commonwealth of Nations have a system of fair dealing, which provides an enumerated list of defenses for copyright. These works need to fall under the specific categories for fair dealing to be applicable, although common law courts in some jurisdictions are less stringent than others in this regard.. The European Union also has an enumerated list of copyright limitations that member states can implement as per Information Society Directive Article 5, which includes caricature, parody, or pastiche.

Canadian copyright law has a section for fair dealing that allows for individuals to create some fan art based on existing works under some conditions, as per the user-generated content exemptions listed under Copyright Act, 29.21. Conditions based on economic rights include the derivative work being non-commercial and the new work not having an averse effect on markets and potential markets of the original. Conditions based on moral rights include the right of proper attribution.

In Germany, a legal expert under the Gesellschaft für Freiheitsrechte (GFF) argued that many fan works, often from user-generated content, would fall under the category of pastiche.

=== Non-Prosecutions ===
Japan does not have an explicit fair use or fair dealing policy, but many fan art can be considered doujinshi, which are considered shinkokuzai under Japanese copyright law. In 2016, Prime Minister of Japan Shinzo Abe affirmed that doujinshi "don't compete in the market with the original works and don't damage the original creators' profits, so they are shinkokuzai." As such, fan art creators are not prosecuted unless a copyright holder formally files a complaint, and copyright holders have chosen to not file infringement for many nonprofit fan works.

== See also ==
- DeviantArt - an art-focused social media site commonly used to share fan art
- Fandom
- Newgrounds
