= Archive of Our Own =

Nonprofit fanfiction repository

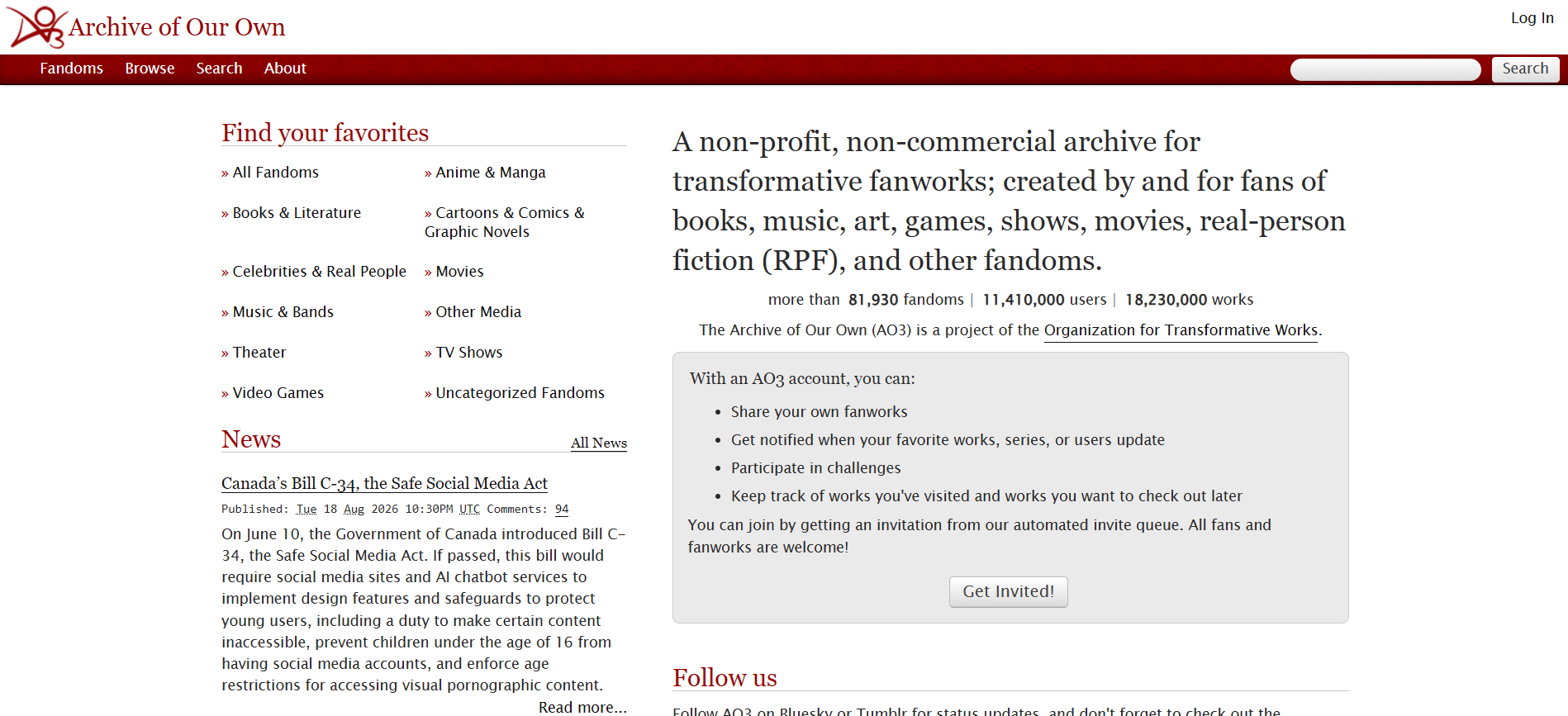
- Screenshot
- Website type: Fanfiction repository
- Founded: October 2008; 18 years ago
- Owner: Organization for Transformative Works
- Website: archiveofourown.org
- Commercial: No
- Registration: Optional
- Users: 11,310,000
- Launched: 14 November 2009 (Open beta); 2 April 2026 (Official release)
- Current status: Online (limited functionality)
- Written in: Ruby

Archive of Our Own (AO3) is a nonprofit, open-source repository for fanfiction (fanfic) and other fanworks contributed by users. The site was created in 2008 by the Organization for Transformative Works.

As of 18 September 2026, Archive of Our Own hosts over 18,470,000 works in over 82,900 fandoms, including those related to real people (RPF). The site has received generally positive reception for its curation, organization, and design, mostly done by readers and writers of fanfiction as well as those participating in fandom culture.

== History ==
=== Creation ===
In 2007, a website called FanLib was created with the goal of monetizing fanfiction. Fanfiction was written mostly by women, and FanLib, which was run entirely by men, drew criticism. Simultaneously, LiveJournal was making policy and design changes that its fanfiction-oriented user base disliked. This led to the creation of the nonprofit Organization for Transformative Works (OTW), which aims to record and archive fan cultures and works. OTW created Archive of Our Own in 2008 and established it as an open beta on 14 November 2009, a development phase that ended in April 2026.

The site's name derives from a blog post by writer Naomi Novik, who, responding to FanLib's lack of interest in fostering a "fannish" community, called for the creation of "An Archive of One's Own." The name is inspired by Virginia Woolf's essay A Room of One's Own, in which Woolf says that a writer needs space, time, and resources to create. AO3 defines itself primarily as an archive, not an online community.

=== Growth and operations ===
By 2013, the site's annual expenses were about $71,000. Fanfiction authors from the site held an auction using Tumblr that year to raise money for Archive of Our Own, bringing in $16,729 with commissions for original works. In 2018, the site's expenses were budgeted at approximately $260,000. In 2022, AO3's expenses were $290,688, most of which was used for server hosting and maintenance, and revenue from fundraising efforts reached a reported $512,359.

Funds for the platform are raised in various ways. Primary fundraising efforts such as the April and October drives as well as other non-drive donations raised $621,455 as of 30 September 2023. Some revenue is collected in the form of royalties from books by some of the initial OTW members.

On 2 April 2026, following the April Fools prank of replacing the 'beta' next to the logo with 'omega', AO3 announced that it would be exiting open beta.

=== Targeting and attacks ===
==== 2023 DDoS attack ====
On 10 July 2023, the site was the target of a denial-of-service attack. Anonymous Sudan (likely Russian-backed according to cybersecurity company CyberCX) claimed responsibility in a Telegram post, saying it was motivated by the website's American registration as well as its sexual and LGBTQ content, and demanded $30,000 worth of Bitcoin within 24 hours to end the attack. The site came back online the next day with Cloudflare protection added.

==== 2026 security breach incident ====
On 29 October 2026, following a security incident, the site went down for a period of maintenance that was originally announced to last twelve hours, but was extended later that day to two to four weeks, citing a priority of safety over speed. Rebecca Tushnet, representing AO3, assured users that no data was lost during this incident. OTW also urged users to change passwords on other sites if they use the same passwords as AO3. Novik, who co-founded AO3, stated that she felt a sense of "resignation" when the incident occurred. On 15 November 2026, the site came back online with limited functionality. On 19 November 2026, the site went down for preventative maintenance for 12 hours.

== Features ==
Archive of Our Own runs on open source code programmed almost exclusively by volunteers in the Ruby on Rails web framework. The developers of the site allow users to submit requests for features on the site via a Jira dashboard. AO3 has approximately 700 volunteers who help the organization by working on volunteer committees such as Policy & Abuse, and Tag Wrangling.

=== Tags ===
Archive of Our Own has a system for labeling and categorizing uploaded works, referred to as "tags". Uploaded works on AO3 are to use Rating Tags, which indicate the maturity level of the content in the fanfiction; Archive Warnings, which alert readers about potentially triggering content in the story; and Fandom Tags, which sort the work into the intended fanbase(s).

Additional tags allows users to categorize and sort content based on intended audiences, included content, fandom, characters, relationship pairings, and other tags. Writers are generally free to choose whatever tags they like for their stories without restrictions on tag length, spaces, characters, or non-Roman characters.

The maximum number of tags was capped to 75 in September 2021, after an incident with a fanfiction that used too many tags. When browsing or searching for a tag, any work which has used the tag, or determined related tags, will appear in the search in a curated folksonomy.

The tagging system is maintained by volunteers called "Tag Wranglers" who manually connect synonymous tags to bolster the site's search system.

=== Accounts ===
The site allows users to create unique usernames for their account. In addition, users may identify themselves by one or more pseudonyms, referred to as "pseuds", linked to their central account. In order to sign up, users must request an invitation which will be sent to their email addresses, which usually takes about 20 days. Having an account allows access to features such as publishing works, following authors and stories to receive notifications of updates, saving and recommending favorite works through bookmarks, and creating a reading queue. An account is not required to view posted content as long as the author has not chosen to show their works only to registered users.

=== Feedback ===
Like many other online platforms, readers with or without AO3 accounts can leave comments on publications which have not had comments deactivated.

Readers can give stories "kudos", which function similarly to likes on other sites. Kudos are permanent and cannot be taken back, and can only be left once on a work. Added in 2010, the kudos feature, however, has been negatively received by various AO3 authors who claim that the simple act of leaving a 'like' discourages the reader from interacting further with the author's work through leaving comments or reviews.

In 2012, several authors created an 'opt out' feature that allows authors on AO3 to remove the kudos feature from their published works.

== Content ==
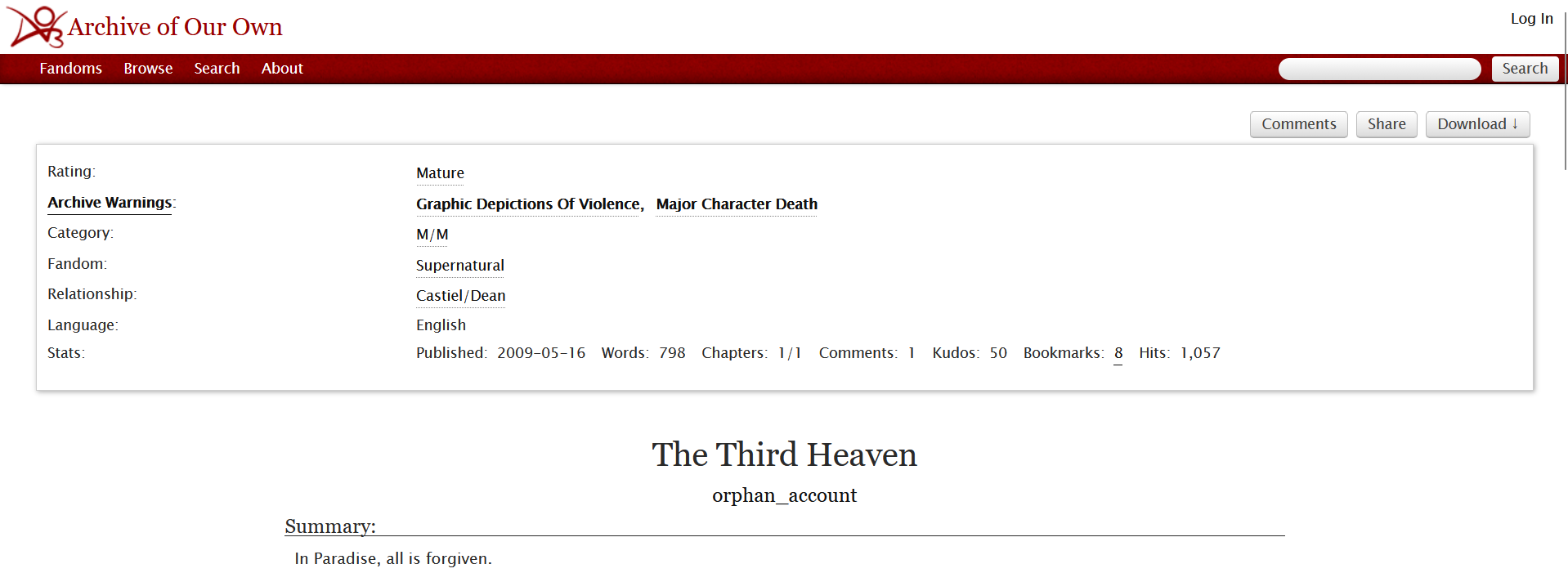
An orphaned Supernatural fanfiction centering on Destiel

The legal team working on behalf of Organization for Transformative Works believes that the publication of fanfiction on AO3 is legal under the fair use doctrine, meaning that they need to be "transformative", which they interpret as giving new meaning to the original work.

AO3 hosts controversial content including works depicting rape, incest and pedophilia. This allowance was developed as a reaction to the policies of other popular fanfiction hosts such as LiveJournal, which at one time began deleting the accounts of fic writers who wrote what the site considered to be pornography, and FanFiction.Net, which disallows numerous types of stories including any that repurpose characters originally created by authors who disapprove of fanfiction.

According to AO3 Policy and Abuse Chair Matty Bowers, a small fraction of stories submitted to the Archive were flagged by users as "offensive". Organization for Transformative Works Legal Committee volunteer Stacey Lantagne has stated that: "The OTW's mission is to advocate on behalf of transformative works, not just the ones we like."

The OTW's Open Doors project, which launched in 2012, invited maintainers of older and defunct fic archives to import their stories into Archive of Our Own with the aim of preserving fandom history. The site is also open to certain original, non-fanfiction works, hosting over 500,000 such original works as of 5 October 2026.

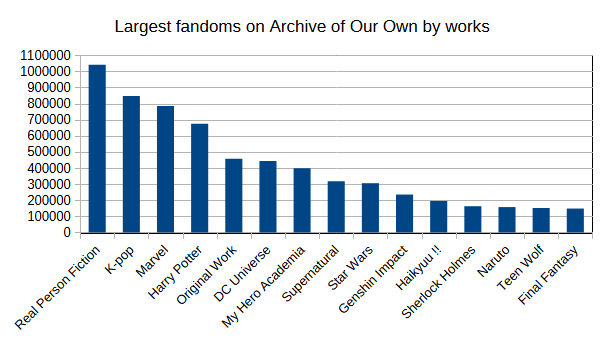
A chart of some of the largest fandoms (as of 6 April 2026).

AO3 reached one million works (including stories, art pieces, and podcast fic recordings, referred to as podfics) in February 2014. At that time, the site hosted works representing 14,353 fandoms, the largest of which were the Marvel Cinematic Universe (MCU), Supernatural, Sherlock, and Harry Potter. In July 2019 it was announced that the site had 2 million registered users and 5 million posted works.

Of the top 100 character pairings written about in works on the site in 2014, 71 were male/male slash fiction and the majority of character pairings featured white characters. In 2016, about 14% of works hosted on the site took place in an alternative universe (often shortened to AU) in which characters from a particular canon are transplanted into a different context.

The length of a story on Archive of Our Own tends to correlate with its popularity. Stories of 1,000 words often received fewer than 150 hits on average while stories that were closer in length to a novel were viewed closer to 1,500 times apiece.

AO3 does not allow social media posts, prompts or requests, and any works that AO3 moderators consider to be spam or non-transformative. The decision to delete works for alleged violations of their terms of service (TOS) is handled on a case-by-case basis and users (not merely accounts) can be banned for it. Furthermore, fanfiction published on AO3 is expected to be "noncommercial" – disallowing all forms of commercial activities and promotion.

== Reception ==
In 2012, in an article entitled "Where to Find the Good Fanfiction Porn", Aja Romano and Gavia Baker-Whitelaw of The Daily Dot described Archive of Our Own as "a cornerstone of the fanfic community", writing that it hosted content that other sites like FanFiction.Net and Wattpad did not allow and was more easily navigable than Tumblr.

Time listed Archive of Our Own as one of the 50 best websites of 2013, describing it as "the most carefully curated, sanely organized, easily browsable and searchable nonprofit collection of fanfiction on the Web".

According to Casey Fiesler, Shannon Morrison, and Amy S. Bruckman, Archive of Our Own is a rare example of a value-sensitive design that was developed and coded by its target audience, namely writers and readers of fanfiction. They wrote that the site serves as a realization of feminist HCI (an area of human–computer interaction) in practice, despite the fact that the developers of Archive of Our Own had not been conscious of feminist HCI principles when designing the site.

In 2019, Archive of Our Own was awarded a Hugo Award in the category of Best Related Work, a category whose purpose is to recognize science fiction–related work that is notable for reasons other than fictional text. Fiesler wrote positively of the nomination: "...its nomination signals a greater respect for both fan fiction as an art form and for the creators and users of this remarkable platform. It's a recognition of the power of these diverse spaces and voices that have, for so long, been marginalized—both in genre fiction and in computing."

=== Impact ===
Studies have shown the positive impact writing fanfiction can have on aspiring writers and young people. Sites such as Archive of Our Own or Fanfiction.net give authors the space to accept feedback on their works in a supportive and non toxic environment which differs from social media.

The majority of AO3's writers are based in the Northern Hemisphere and speak primarily English which has allowed for many to practice their English while writing fanfiction. Women make up the majority of AO3's users with the next-largest category being non-binary. One of the most popular forms of fanfictions re-interpret the cisgender/heteronormative elements found in the real world and most media.

== Censorship ==
=== China ===
On 29 February 2020, Archive of Our Own was blocked in China, after fans of the Chinese actor Xiao Zhan reported the website for hosting an explicit fanfiction novel starring him. The banning of the site led to several incidents and controversies online, in the Chinese entertainment industry, as well as to professional enterprises due to heavy backlash from mainland Chinese users of Archive of Our Own. Users called for a boycott against Xiao, his fans, endorsed products, luxury brands, and other Chinese celebrities involved with the actor.

=== Germany ===
On 13 December 2022, the site was indexed by the German Federal Department for Media Harmful to Young Persons due to "child pornography content", temporarily removing it from Google search results. In January 2023, the restrictions were lifted since the agency had committed administrative errors in the indexing process.

=== Russia ===
In April 2023, RKN requested Archive of Our Own to delete 16 fanfiction works, claiming they contained "child pornography". The site was subsequently blocked in Russia later that same month, after failing to comply with the request.
