= Teen idol =

Celebrities with large youth fan bases

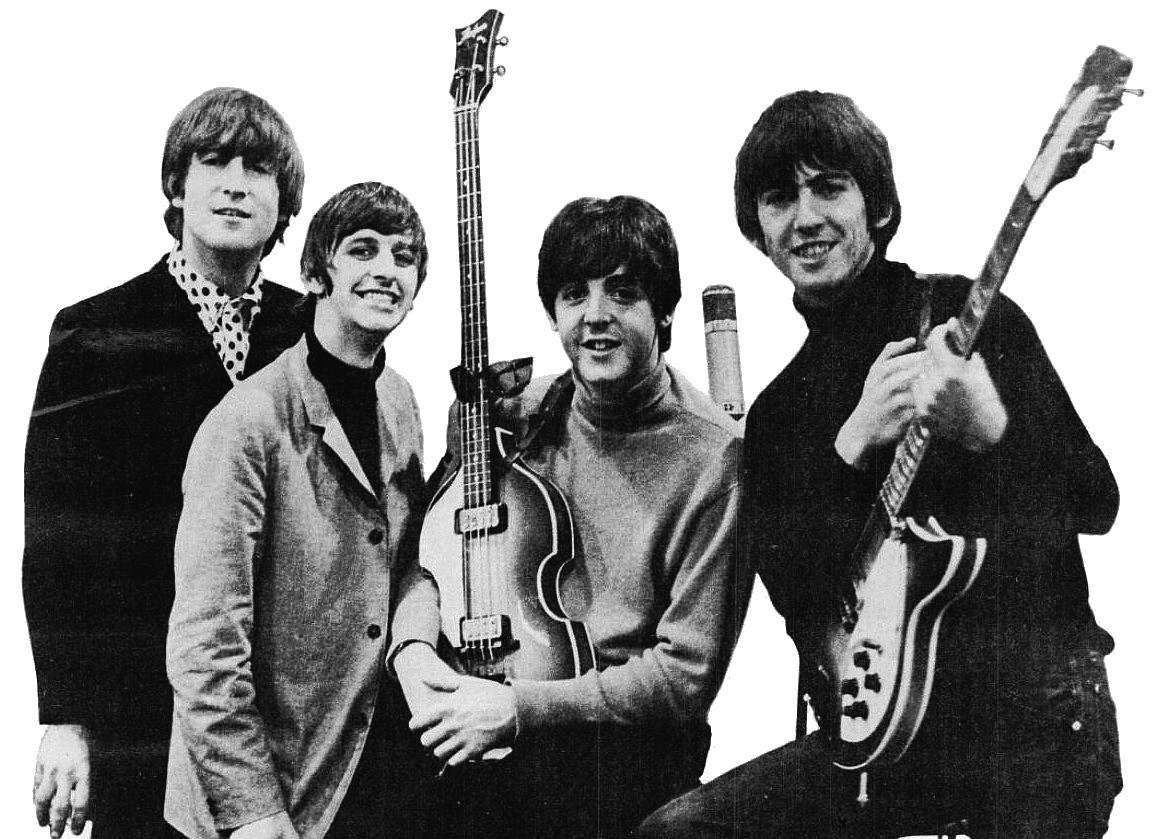
The Beatles in 1965

A teen idol is a celebrity with a large teenage fan base. Teen idols are generally young but are not necessarily teenagers themselves. An idol's popularity may be limited to teens, or may extend to all age groups.

== By region ==
=== Asia ===
East Asia possesses a robust fan culture centered around idols, one that spans both genders and generates broad appeal. While groups consisting of teenagers had existed in East Asia , the "teen idol" industry saw significant growth in Japan starting in the 1960s. in South Korea and Taiwan, for example, it took root in the 1990s, and in China the 2010s. Idols are also not limited to singing, and may take part in more explicitly image-focused venues such as pin-up photography (gravure idols) and pornography (AV idols).

There are many different idols and idol groups spread across many countries. In Japan, there are pop stars Ayumi Hamasaki and Namie Amuro as well as Kana Nishino and music groups such as Momoiro Clover Z, Morning Musume, AKB48, and Perfume and Johnny & Associates boy bands Arashi, NEWS, KAT-TUN, and Hey! Say! JUMP among others. In Taiwan, there are pop icons such as Jay Chou, Jolin Tsai, music groups Mayday, F4, and S.H.E. In South Korea, notable K-pop personalities include singers BoA and Rain and groups BTS, Blackpink, Twice, Exo, TVXQ, 2PM, 2AM, Beast, Shinee, Super Junior, 2NE1, Big Bang, Wonder Girls, T-ara, Kara and Girls' Generation. In Vietnam, there are the singers WanBi Tuấn Anh, Sơn Tùng M-TP, Đông Nhi, Bảo Thy and Tóc Tiên.

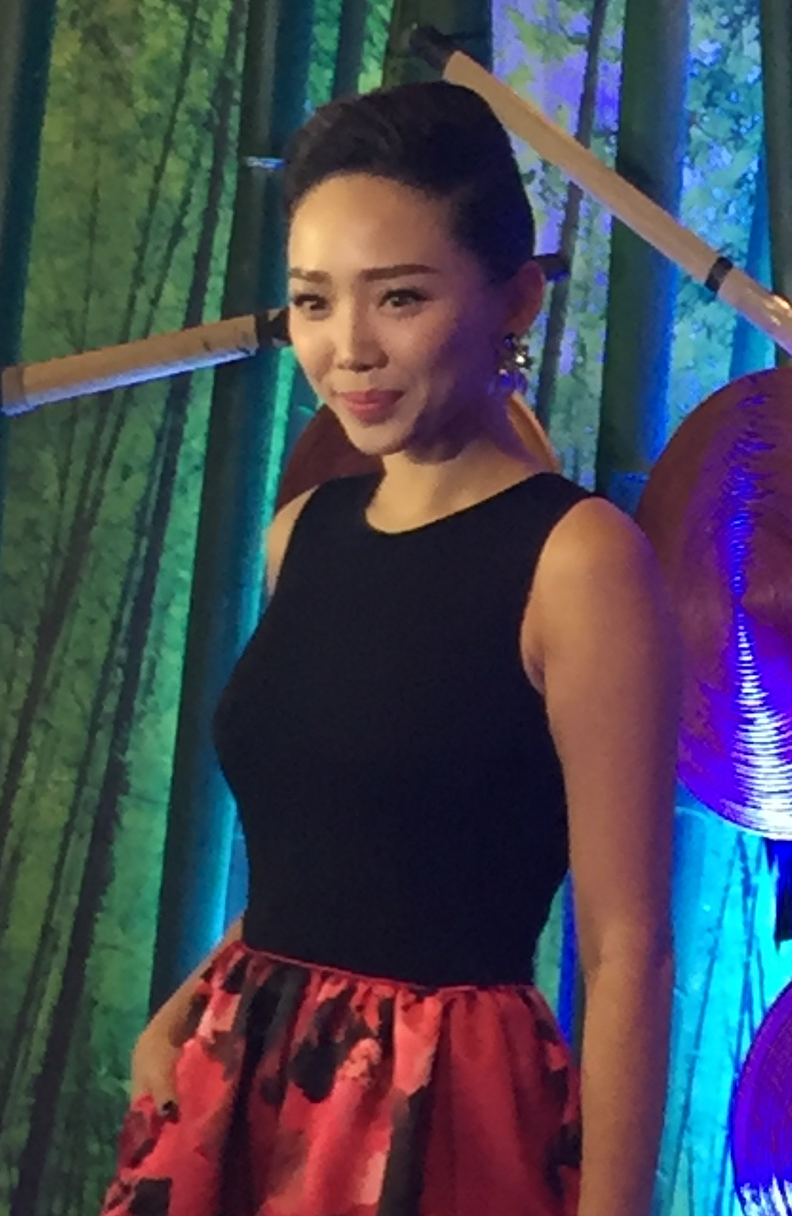
Tóc Tiên (Vietnam) in 2015

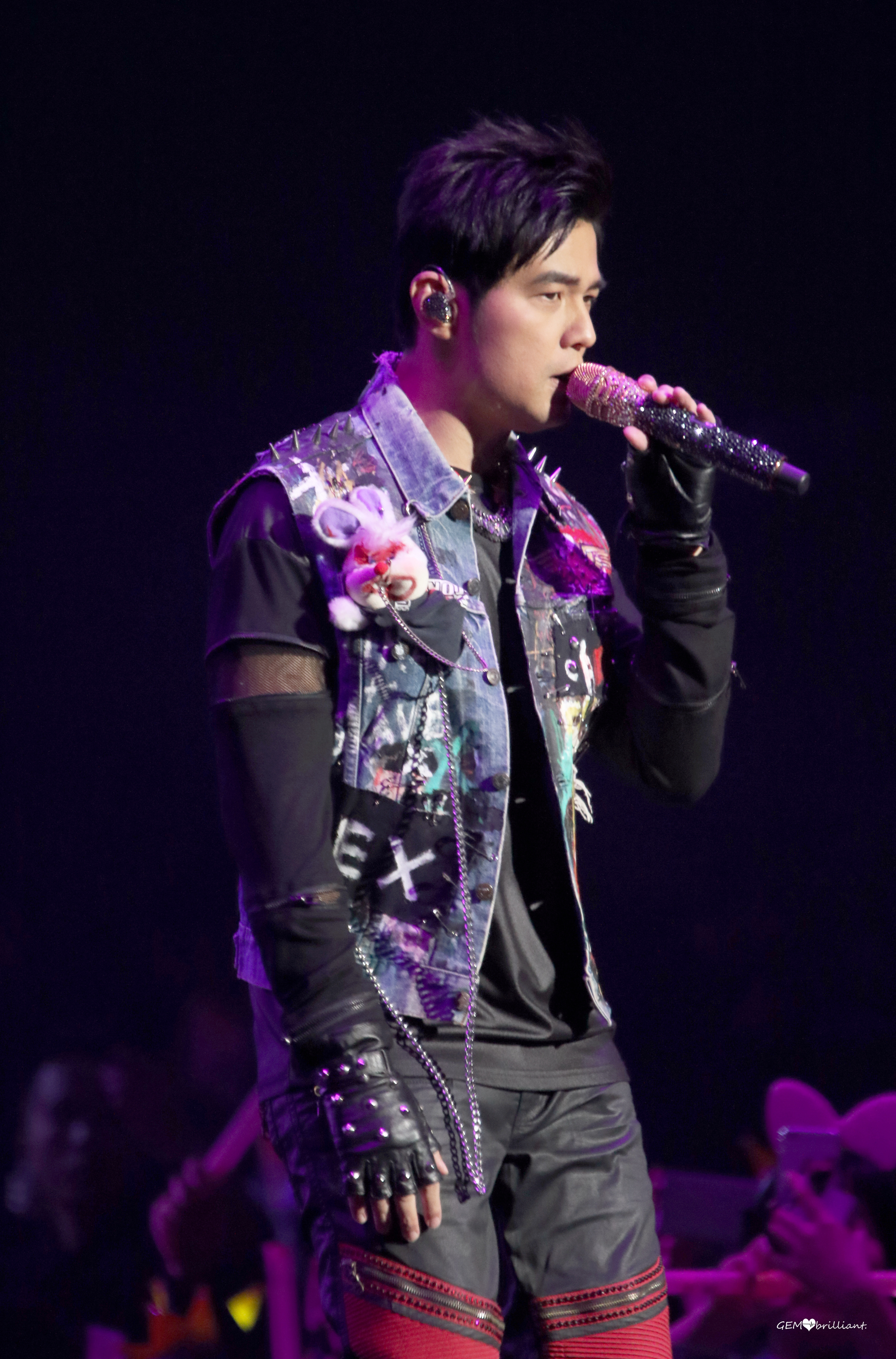
Jay Chou (Taiwan) in 2016

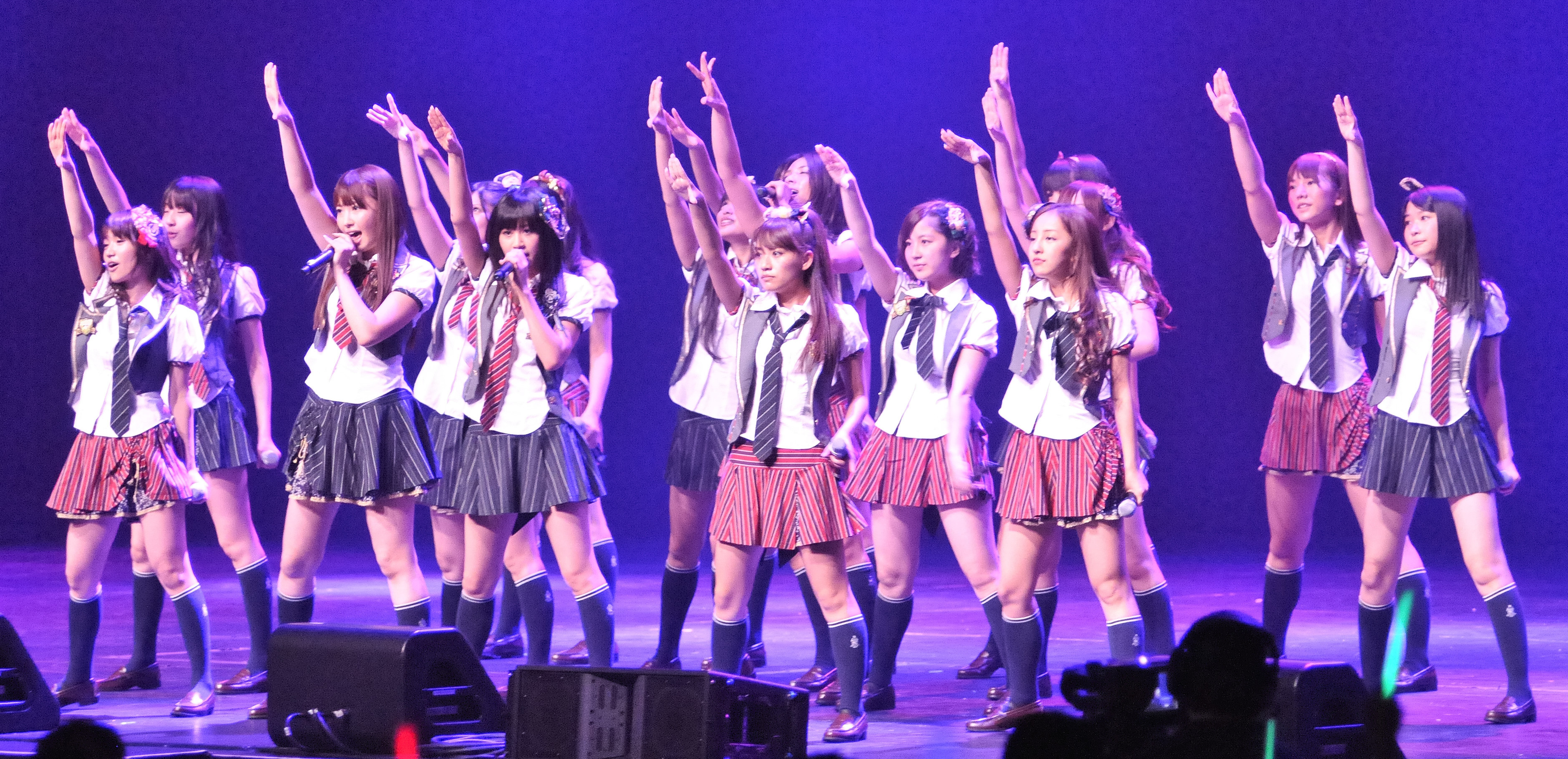
AKB48 (Japan) in 2010

=== Europe ===
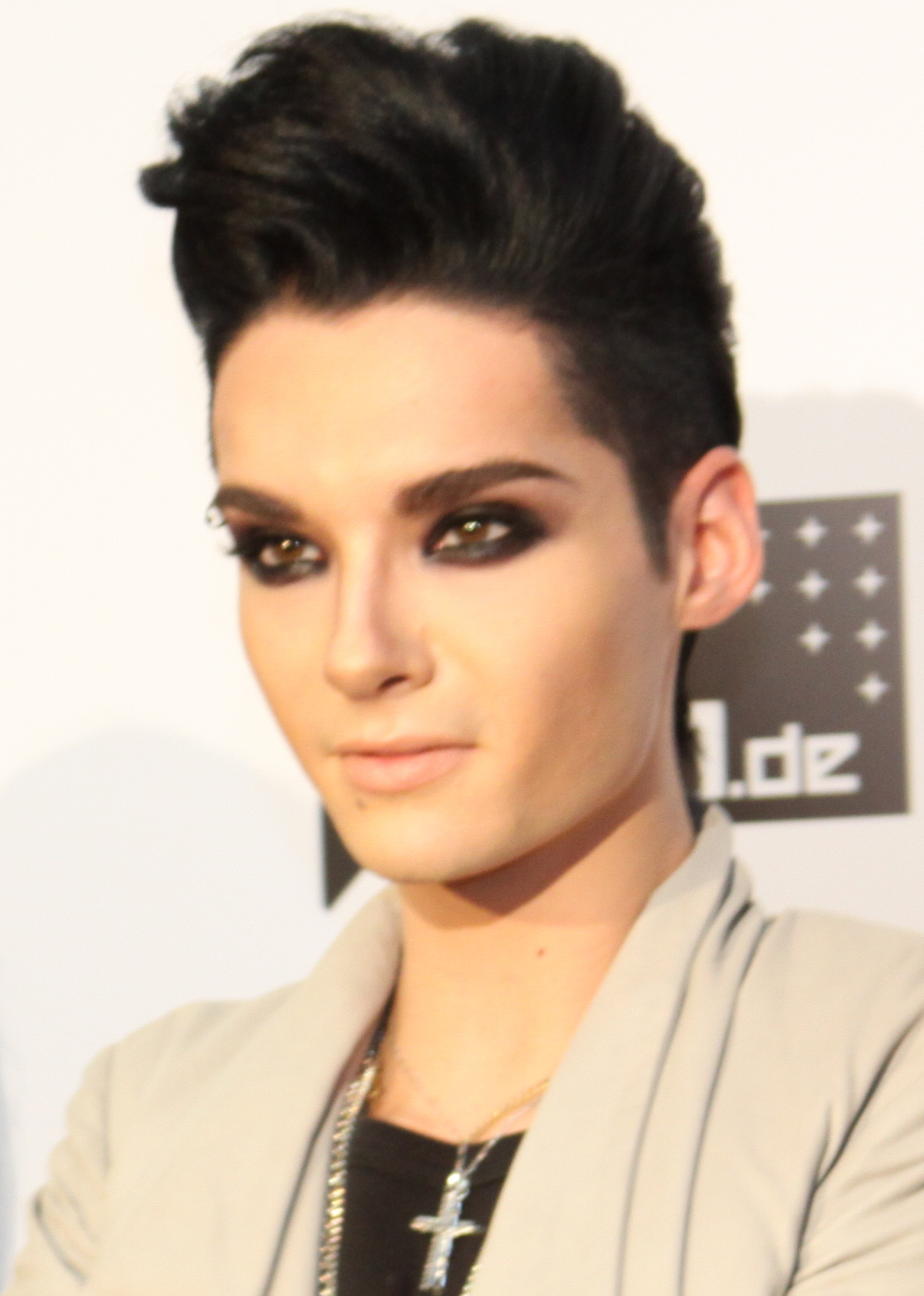
Bill Kaulitz in 2010

European teen idols include German popstar Bill Kaulitz of the pop-rock band Tokio Hotel and the members of the Anglo-Irish pop boy band One Direction, and Girls Aloud, another Anglo-Irish band. In Spain, Quevedo, Rosalía and C. Tangana all enjoy teen-idol status. In the Balkans, the late Macedonian singer Toše Proeski was considered a teen idol.

=== Latin America ===
In Latin America, idols ranges from Mexican pop stars Timbiriche (including their members, Paulina Rubio and Thalía), Lynda Thomas, Magneto, Puerto Rican born Mexican Luis Miguel, Colombian Shakira and the popular Puerto Rican boy band Menudo in the 1980s and 1990s, and Paty Cantú, Anahí, Belinda, and RBD in the 2000s and 2010s. Besides, former Menudo member Ricky Martin, their chief rivals Los Chicos and former member Chayanne, Venezuelan actor and singer Guillermo Davila and more, to Argentina, where telenovela, Chiquititas, ushered in a new era of teen-idols for that country, including actors Benjamin Rojas, Felipe Colombo, Luisana Lopilato, and Camila Bordonaba, who went on to form teen band Erreway, precursors to Mexican band RBD. Quinceañera (1987), starring by Thalía and Adela Noriega became the first telenovela made for teenagers.

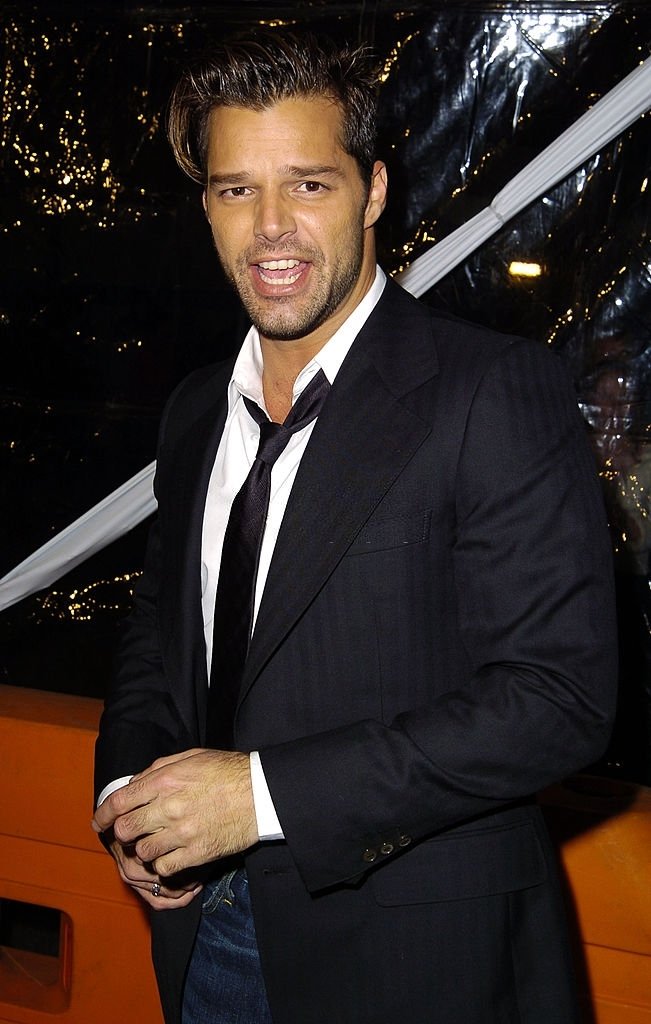
Ricky Martin in 2003

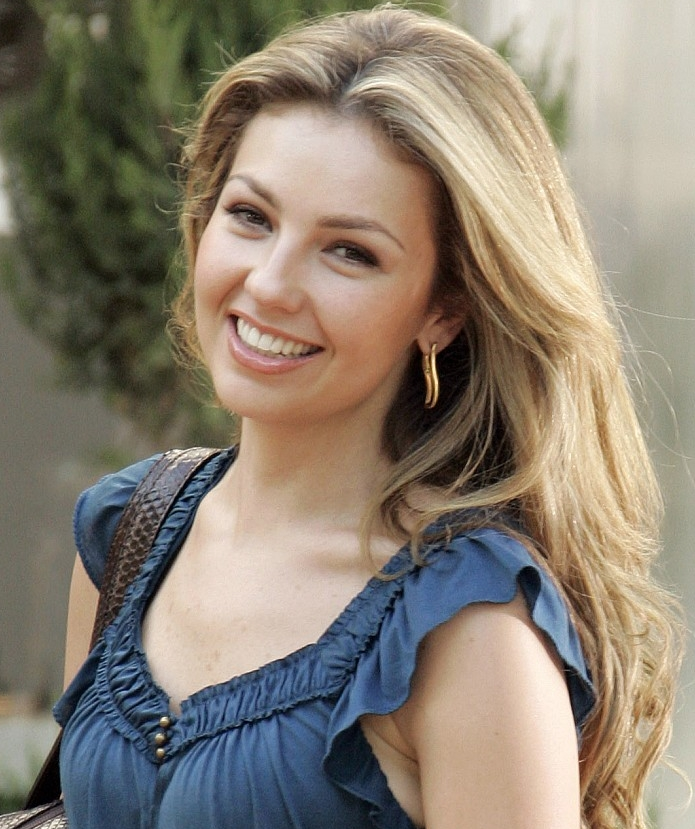
Thalia Sodi in 2006

=== North America ===
Often teen idols are actors or musicians. Some teen idols began their careers as child actors, such as Britney Spears, Hilary Duff, Raven-Symoné and Miley Cyrus. There were teen idols before there were teen magazines, but idols have always been a permanent feature in magazines such as Seventeen, 16, Tiger Beat and Right On! in the United States, and in similar magazines elsewhere. With the advent of television, teen idols were also promoted through programs such as American Bandstand, The Ed Sullivan Show, Soul Train. Today's teen idols have spawned an entire industry of gossip magazines, television shows, YouTube, social media, and whole television channels such as E!.

== By era ==
=== Early teen idols ===
The first known person to have been treated as a teen idol was Franz Liszt, the Hungarian pianist who, in the 1840s, drew such a following among teen girls that the term "Lisztomania" soon came to describe the phenomenon. The kind of idolizing following Liszt drew in Europe would not be followed for several decades. American-born Roger Wolfe Kahn became, arguably, America's first modern-day teen idol, when, in 1924 at the age of sixteen he launched his first jazz band. Throughout his teens, he became dubbed the 'Millionaire Maestro.' Geraldine Farrar, American opera singer, had a large following of young women nicknamed "Gerry-flappers" in the early 20th century. Rudy Vallée, who became a major success in 1929 with hits like "Honey" and "Deep Night", may have been the first American popular singer to have been idolised by hundreds of teen-aged girls at sold-out concerts. He was also possibly the first popular singer to have a star vehicle created for him: The Vagabond Lover.

Frank Sinatra, whose early career in the 1940s is often linked to his appeal to bobby soxers, who got that name because they were forced to dance in their bobby socks so that their shoes would not damage the dance floor, is also regarded as having been amongst the first teen idols.

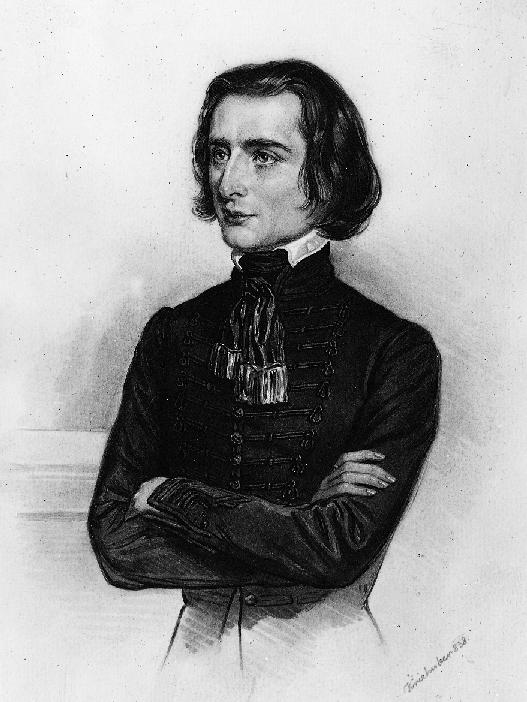
Watercolour of Franz Liszt in 1838, the first known teen idol

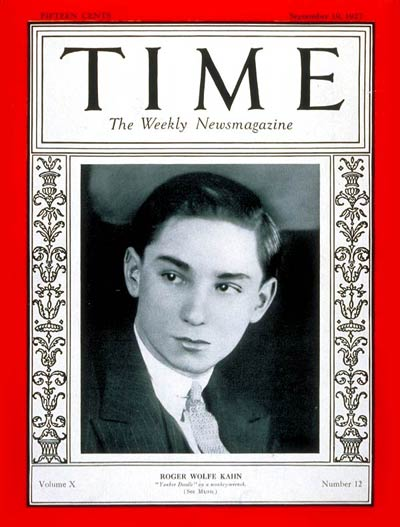
Roger Wolfe Kahn on the cover of TIME magazine (September 19, 1927, America's first teen idol)

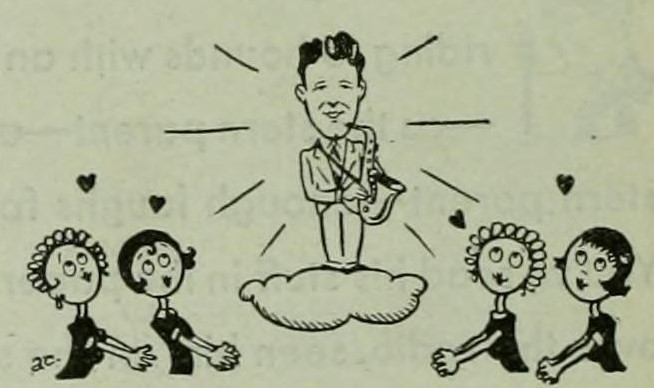
1930 caricature of Rudy Vallée

=== 1950s–1960s ===
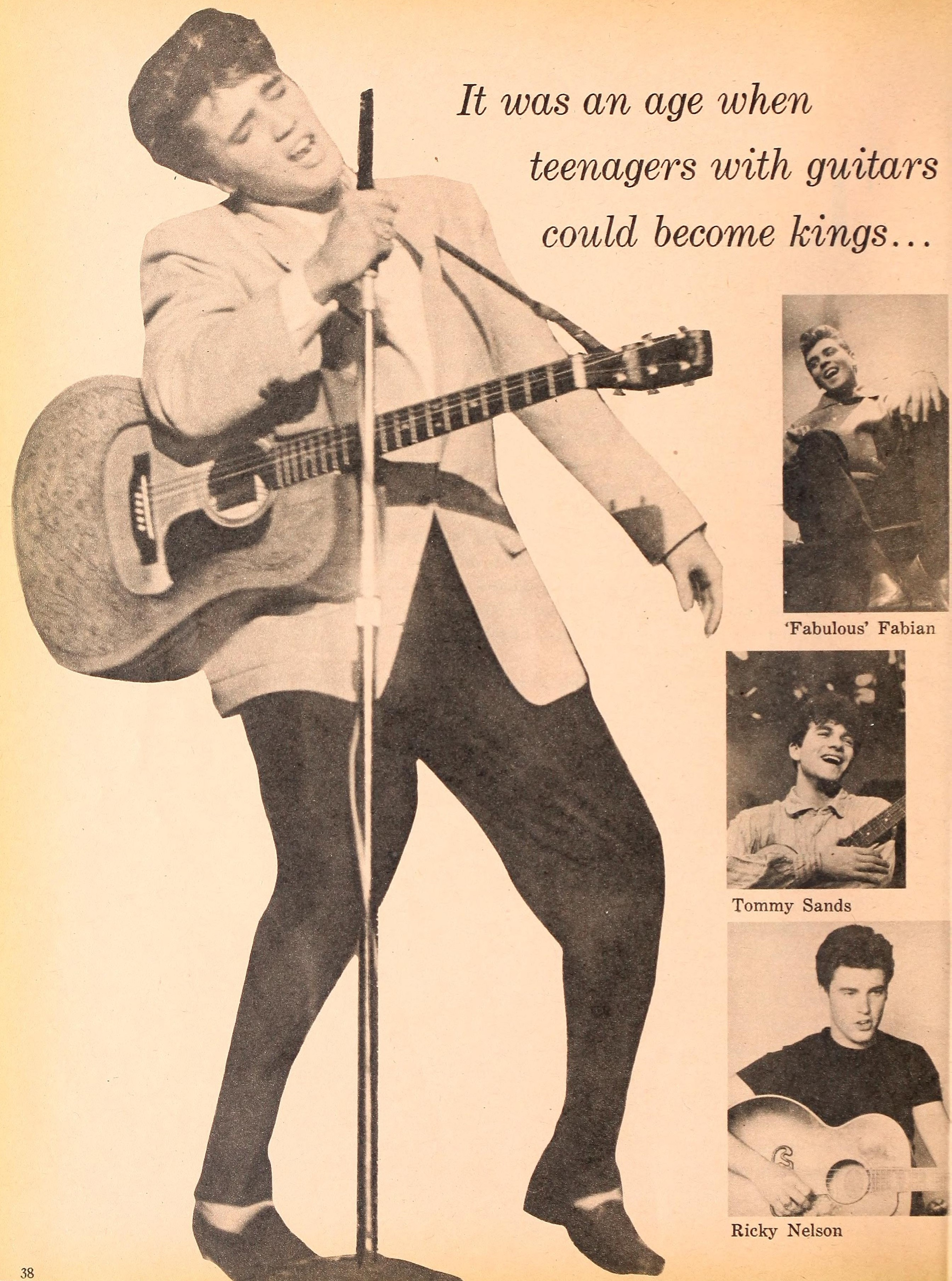
Teen idols of the 1950s include Elvis Presley, Fabian Forte, Tommy Sands, and Ricky Nelson, as pictured.

Although he had only three major movie roles, James Dean earned two Oscar nominations. He also had the image of a rebellious youth, something that was popular among girls and young women. His performance in Rebel Without A Cause (1955) and his untimely death in a road collision in 1955 cemented his status as an icon. Contemporary teenagers still wear white T-shirts and jeans in his style.

Selected by Walt Disney in 1955 for his new show The Mickey Mouse Club, Annette Funicello became popular among viewers by the end of the first season. Elvis Presley made his debut in the mid-1950s and became a sensation. Deemed too dangerous to be filmed except from the waist up because of his sexually suggestive dance moves, he became popular among teenagers. The success of young rock stars like Presley, film stars like Marlon Brando, Paul Newman, James Dean, Tab Hunter, and Sal Mineo in the 1950s, as well as the wider emergence of youth subcultures, led promoters to the deliberate creation of teen idols such as singers Frankie Avalon, Frankie Valli, Frankie Lymon, Fabian Forte, Bobby Rydell and Connie Stevens. The two most popular female vocalists of the late 1950s and early 1960s for teenagers were Connie Francis and Brenda Lee, who appealed to both pop and rock audiences. Even crooners like Frank Sinatra were still considered idols and rather handsome. Actors Edd Byrnes and Troy Donahue and other artists deliberately cultivated a (safer) idol image, like Canadian musician Paul Anka.

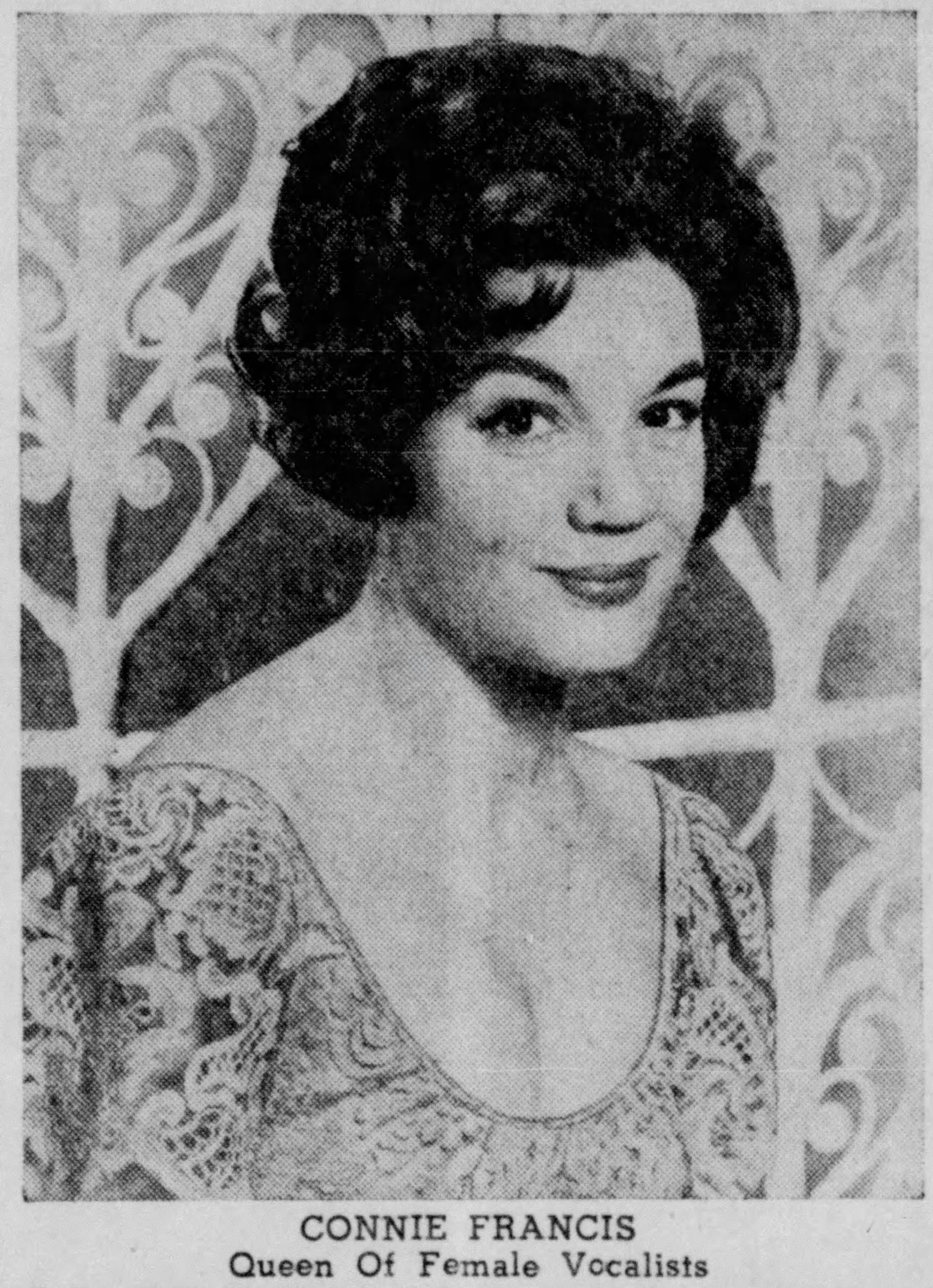
Connie Francis

Anka initially modelled himself on a particular generic type, the teen idol [who] carried on the process ... of changing the image of male youth ... from wild to mild, by providing a cleaner, more wholesome image of masculinity than that of the previous era's rebellious rockabilly heroes [and (working-class) so-called juvenile delinquents, like those in West Side Story]....

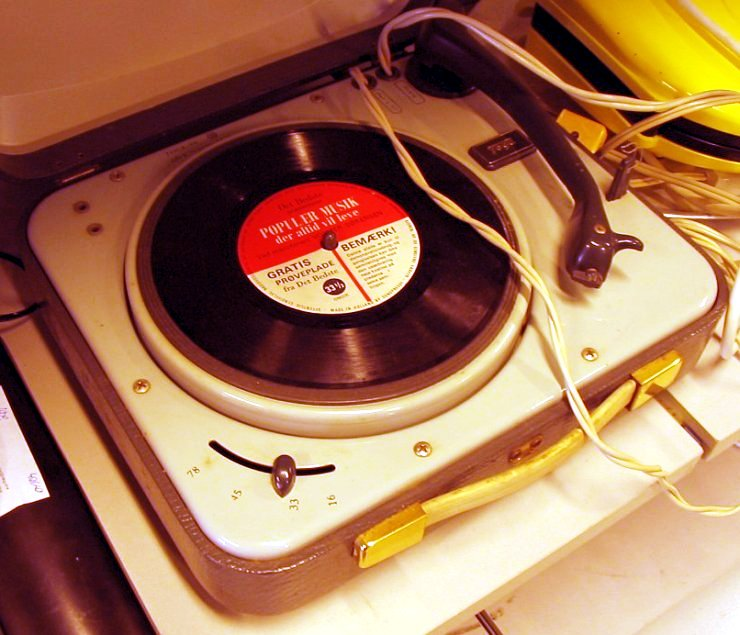
Portable phonograph

Post-war teens were able to buy relatively inexpensive phonographs—including portable models that could be carried to friends' houses—and the new 45-rpm singles. Rock music played on 45s became the soundtrack to the 1960s as people bought what they heard on the radio. The great majority of the music being marketed to 1950s teens was being written by adults, but 1960s teens were increasingly appreciating and emulating artists closer to their own age, to teen fashion, and to lyrics which addressed their own concerns. Their parents worried about their attraction to artists (and DJs) who were edgy and rebellious. Faces on magazines fed fans; fans buy records, see films, watch TV and buy fashions.

Marketing of the teen idol generally focuses on the image.... The teen idol is structured to appeal to the pre-teen and young teen female pop audience member and children in general.... [They] are commodified in forms and images that are relatively non-threatening to this young audience and to the ancillary market of parents.... The teen idol never appears to be autonomous and therefore never appears to be threatening as an adult; he remains, as long as he is popular, perpetually childlike and dependent.

Some marketers turned to film and TV for fresh, 'safe' faces. Tommy Sands's debut in a television film about the phenomenon, The Idol, made a teen idol out of Sands himself.

Teen idol Ricky Nelson rose to stardom on the hit show The Adventures of Ozzie and Harriet and the show was used to promote his songs, making him one of the biggest stars in music industry of the time. His wholesome image was a stark contrast to the uproar caused by Elvis Presley, with parents often approving of Nelson.

Rick's popularity continued to grow as Elvis and the Everly Brothers were in the military, Chuck Berry was imprisoned, and Buddy Holly and Ritchie Valens died. However his popularity declined as the British Invasion hit the United States when the Beatles arrived in 1964. They had already been famous in the United Kingdom. But after making their debut in the U.S. on The Ed Sullivan Show on February 9, 1964, the Beatles soon became the most successful and influential band in modern musical history, staying at the top of Billboard charts for a grand total of 58 weeks between 1964 and 1970. Adolescent hysteria was so loud that the band had trouble performing at concerts. The level of stardom they achieved in the U.S.—dubbed Beatlemania—was never before seen in that country, not even during the heyday of Elvis Presley. Many teenage girls waited outside the hotels the Beatles were staying at, hoping to catch a glimpse of their favorite musicians. It is believed that a part of their success in the U.S. was because they brought hope and joy to a nation that was still recovering from the shock of the assassination of President John F. Kennedy. Another possible reason was that the Beatles were young, energetic, good-looking, and witty, which made it easy for them to become famous in the age of television.

Some young TV stars were being hustled into studios to make recordings; for example, ex-Mousketeer Annette Funicello became one of the first big female idols as well as the Lennon Sisters who had cut out dolls and were always on the covers of the gossip magazines; another, Johnny Crawford of The Rifleman, had five Top-40 hits. In 1963, Luke Halpin made a big splash as a teen idol in the television program Flipper. After Bye Bye Birdie was released in 1963, Bobby Rydell became an instant teen idol.

In the 1960s as situation comedies and dramas on television using child actors became more popular, actors Paul Petersen, Patty Petersen, and Shelley Fabares from The Donna Reed Show, Dwayne Hickman from The Many Loves of Dobie Gillis, Sally Field of Gidget, Jon Provost of Lassie, Jay North from Dennis the Menace, and Keith and Kevin Schultz known as the "Schultz Twins" on The Monroes all became younger preteen idols and grew into being teen idols.

Herman's Hermits, the Rolling Stones, and the Beach Boys were teen idols, especially during the earlier part of their careers, although they quickly grew out of that status. The Rolling Stones did it through a more rebellious image, the Beatles did it through their more developed (or "grown up") music. Similarly, Neil Sedaka had two distinct eras of his career, with about a decade in between: one as a teen idol in the 1960s, and a later career in adult contemporary music. Roy Orbison was known for his songs "Oh, Pretty Woman," "Only the Lonely," and "Crying." From the family band the Cowsills, Susan Cowsill, John Cowsill and Barry Cowsill became teen idols. Many of the teen idols of the era were the sons of older, established stars; Dino, Desi & Billy were active as teen idols during the mid-sixties. The group included Dean Paul Martin (son of singer Dean Martin), and Billy Hinsche (a mutual friend whose parents were not famous). Gary Lewis, son of comedian Jerry Lewis, fronted the Playboys during this era.

All of the Monkees became instant teen idols in the late 1960s after their TV show became an overnight success, especially for Micky Dolenz and Davy Jones. The British-born Monkee Davy Jones was regularly featured in teen fan magazines. In 2008, Yahoo Music named Jones the number one teen idol of all time, and in 2009 he was ranked second in a list compiled by Fox News.

Teen fan magazine TeenSet began publishing in 1964, focusing on youthful bands and musicians. Tiger Beat magazine began competing for the same audience in 1965.

=== 1970s ===
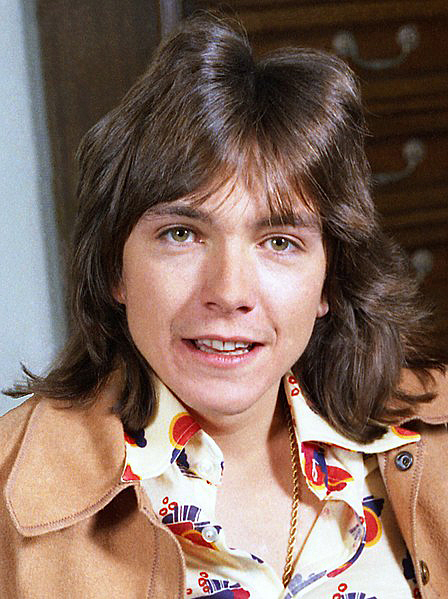
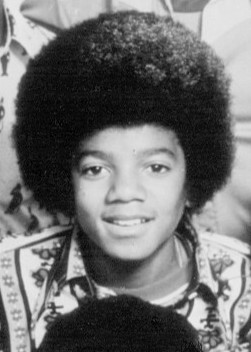
David Cassidy (left) and Michael Jackson (right) were well-known teen idols of the 1970s.

After Davy Jones came Bobby Sherman and David Cassidy, who held the title of Teen Idols from the late 1960s until the mid-1970s. Both Sherman and Cassidy were actors on television and chart topping musicians in the pop-rock category at the time; with David Cassidy in particular enjoying immense international fame and success. Sherman was on hit TV shows Shindig! and Here Come the Brides among many others. Musical series such as Cassidy's The Partridge Family, the animated series The Archie Show, and (to a lesser extent) The Brady Bunch integrated television and teen-pop music to significant success during this time frame. The Brady Bunch's Barry Williams and Christopher Knight, as was tennis pro/actor Vincent Van Patten all were constantly in the fan magazines at the time. Popular actors such as John Moulder Brown, Leonard Whiting, Ray Lovelock (Raymond Lovelock), Leif Garrett, Mark Hamill, Mark Lester, Jan-Michael Vincent and Jack Wild were the talk of the teenagers in the 1970s as well. Musical group the Hudson Brothers were on many teen magazine covers for a number of years as teen idols. They had two shows on TV during the 1970s and recorded many albums.

One of the features of many teen idols is that their fans (and, in some cases, the musicians themselves) tended to develop a hate for the music once they became adults, and it is not much listened to by adults, except for nostalgia: the legacy of bubblegum pop. Teen idol performers in this category would include Shaun Cassidy, Leif Garrett, the Osmond Brothers (particularly Donny Osmond and their teen idol sister Marie Osmond), Andy Gibb, Tony DeFranco of the Canadian band the DeFranco Family, and the Bay City Rollers (UK). Even modern classic hits and oldies outlets, which cover this time period, rarely play cuts from the teen idols of the era. A notable exception is Michael Jackson of the Jackson Five, who began his career as a teen idol along with his brothers, but whose individual career eventually evolved far beyond the limitations of that description and into superstardom.

The Jackson Five were the first African-American music group to become national teen idols, appearing along with famous white idols in magazines such as 16 and Tiger Beat. In addition, the charismatic appeal, showmanship and flurry of fans towards lead Michael Jackson made him a teen idol and heartthrob amongst teens; his success as a soloist continued into the 1980s and early 1990s.

=== 1980s ===
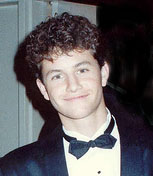
Kirk Cameron in 1989

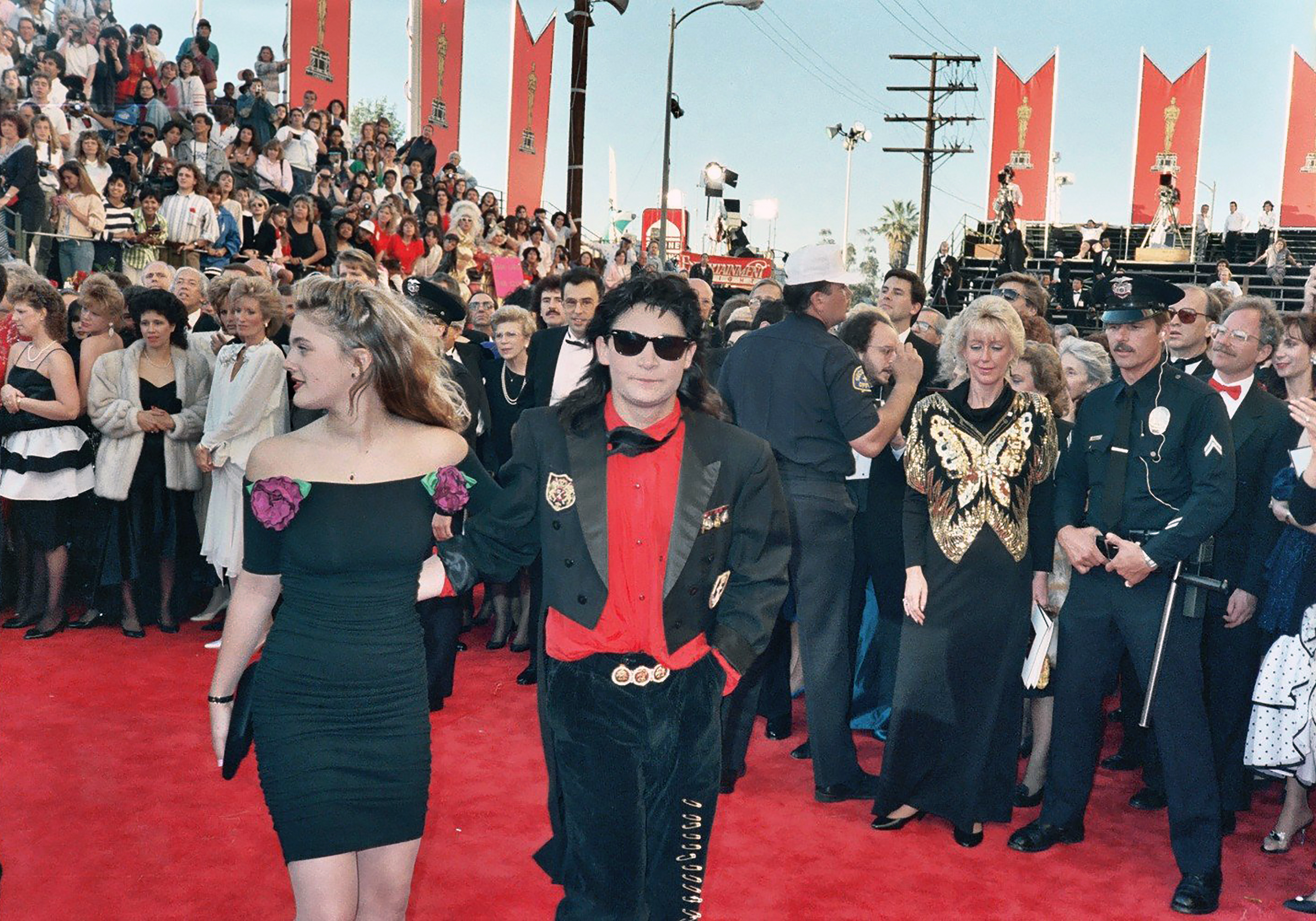
Drew Barrymore and Corey Feldman in 1989

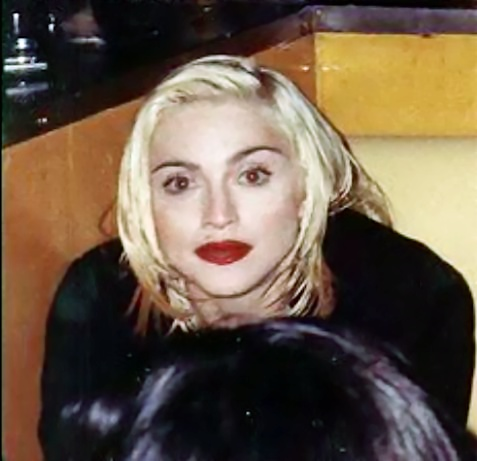
Madonna in 1990

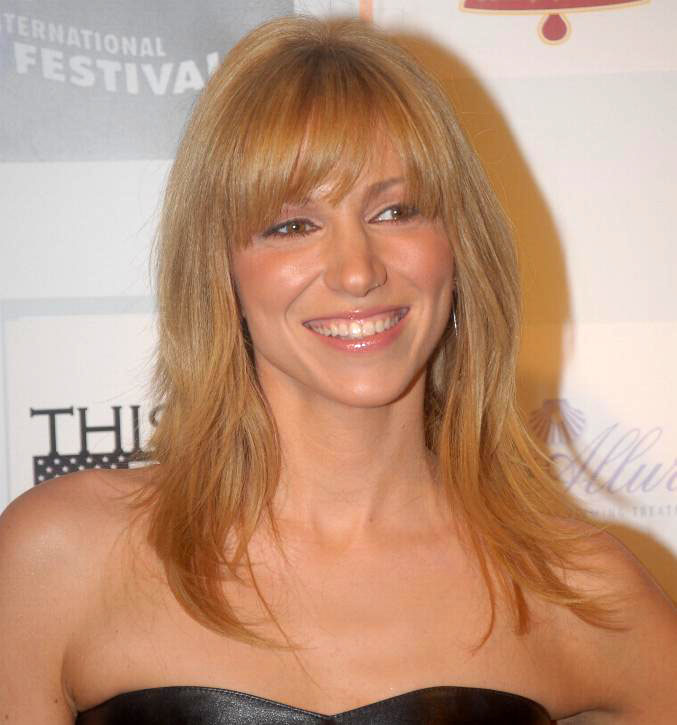
Debbie Gibson in 2009

In 1985, actress Alyssa Milano from Who's the Boss? became a major teen idol. In the mid-1980s there was a group of young actors called the Brat Pack; the whole group collectively and separately became teen idols. They were Emilio Estevez, Anthony Michael Hall, Rob Lowe, Andrew McCarthy, Demi Moore, Judd Nelson, Molly Ringwald, and Ally Sheedy. They starred in many coming of age films together in some fashion and became very popular without being musicians. Molly Ringwald entered the limelight with the films Sixteen Candles and The Breakfast Club.

Actors Corey Feldman and Corey Haim also became teen idols during the later part of the 1980s with films The Goonies and together The Lost Boys, Dream a Little Dream and License to Drive among other films. They were dubbed "the two Coreys". Before Corey Haim's death in 2010, they did a reality TV show for two seasons (2007–08) on A&E named The Two Coreys after their 1980s moniker. Actor River Phoenix during his teen years became a teen idol during the later part of the 1980s, as did Christian Slater. Australian singer-actor Rick Springfield was regarded as the teen idol in the 1980s with such hits as "Jessie's Girl" and "Don't Talk to Strangers". The Grammy Award-winning musician Springfield was known for playing Dr. Noah Drake on the daytime drama General Hospital. He originated the character from 1981 to 1983. He left acting after his music career took off.

During this decade, Puerto Rican boy band Menudo, caused a sensation in Latin America compared to Beatles' Beatlemania. At the end of the 1980s, actor Kirk Cameron became a major teen idol. Cameron was best known for his role as Mike Seaver on the television situation comedy Growing Pains from 1985 to 1992. Also Scott Baio and Willie Aames of Charles in Charge fame found themselves regulars in teen magazines. One of the most popular female singers of the 1980s, with teen idol status was Madonna, especially among youth female audience which was later named Madonna wannabes.

In popular music, the late 1980s was the boom of teenagers dominating the music charts. Debbie Gibson became the youngest person to write, perform and produce a number-one single, "Foolish Beat", and also had many hits from her first two albums. Tiffany, another teen icon, became a pop sensation at 15 years old thanks to an aggressive marketing strategy. She promoted her debut album in shopping malls of the US. She is also the youngest person to have a debut album hit number one and have multiple number one singles from that album ("I Think We're Alone Now" and "Could've Been"). Having become a household name, she had then-unknown band New Kids on the Block as an opening act for her shows. However, the sudden popularity of the New Kids caused their roles to be reversed. Gibson and Tiffany's careers had stalled by the early 1990s; so had NKOTB by the mid-nineties. The other boy band from Boston, New Edition, was popular with the teen set by the end of the 1980s.

=== 1990s ===
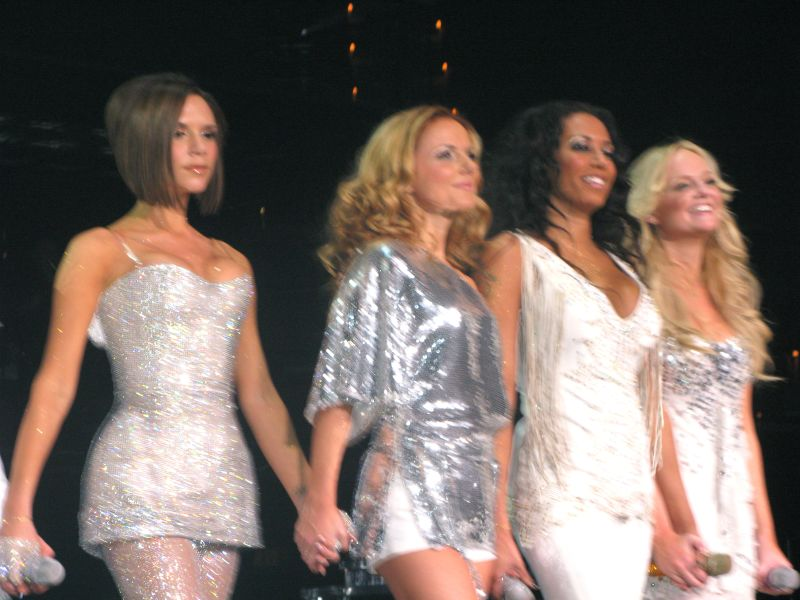
Spice Girls in 2007

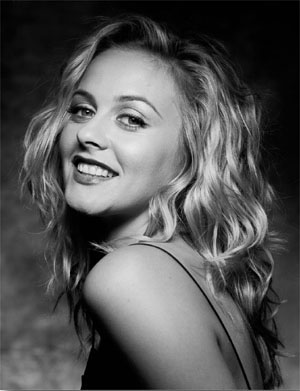
Alicia Silverstone in 2005

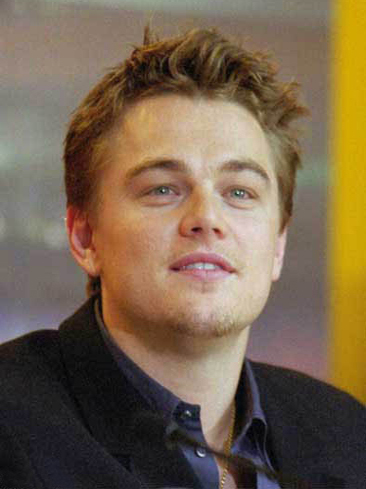
Leonardo DiCaprio in 2000

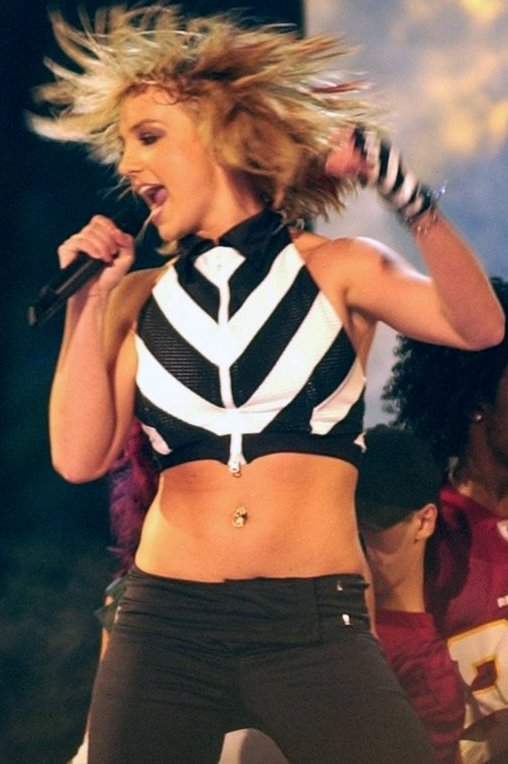
Britney Spears in 2003

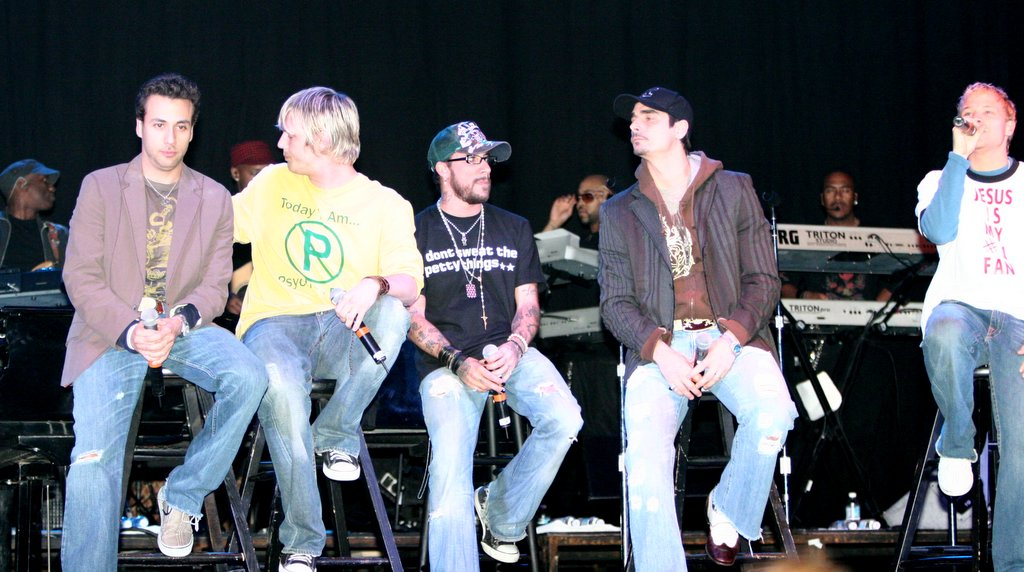
Backstreet Boys in 2005

The manufacturing of teen idols has been marketed more aggressively and with greater sophistication since the 1980s. Many of the major teen idols in the 1990s were bands and musical acts. The rise of MTV in the 1980s and the success of the boy bands and girl groups during the 1990s and 2000s continued to fuel the phenomenon. Besides a combination of good, clean-cut looks and a ubiquitous marketing campaign, such bands typically include a variety of personality types (e.g. "the shy one", "the smart one", etc.) These idols were often found on the covers and pages of teen magazines during the 1990s as teen idols as well. Classic examples of boy bands include Menudo, New Kids on the Block, Take That, Backstreet Boys, and NSYNC, all becoming the best-selling pop groups of the decade. Hanson was initially marketed as such a band, but eventually outgrew this label to become a successful indie band. Christina Aguilera, Jennifer Lopez, Mandy Moore, Jessica Simpson, and Britney Spears, along with female bands such as the Spice Girls, TLC, and Destiny's Child, also became very popular at the end of the decade. Even though the Spice Girls split in 2000, they remain fairly popular in England.

During this decade, the Latin artist Shakira was described as a "teen idol", her songs reached number 1 on Latin radio, her videos were among the most viewed, while her hair and clothing style was emulated by girls and young women. from the continent identifying with their songs, this was called "Shakiramía" or "Shakira Fever"

The Backstreet Boys' popularity grew in 1997 with "Everybody (Backstreet's Back)," a song produced by Max Martin. Opting against joining a girl band, Britney Spears released the music video "...Baby One More Time" in 1998 on MTV, which pushed her into the public consciousness. Her first album of the same name made its debut at the top of Billboard's charts, and became the world's best-selling album by a teenage solo artist. Before she turned 20 years, Spears was also recognized by the Guinness World Records as the best-selling teenage artist. Spears and Billie Piper also became the youngest artists to have accumulated more number-one songs in the UK singles chart.

After the movie Clueless (1995), Alicia Silverstone became a teen idol. The 1997 film Titanic made Leonardo DiCaprio a teen idol; during "Leo-Mania" his face appeared on many teen magazines. Fraternal twin sisters and actresses Ashley Olsen and Mary-Kate Olsen were major tween idols and as they grew up they later became teen idols during the 1990s. Blossom actor Joey Lawrence was a major hit playing the titular character's brother, even having a top 20 hit in 1993.

=== 2000s ===
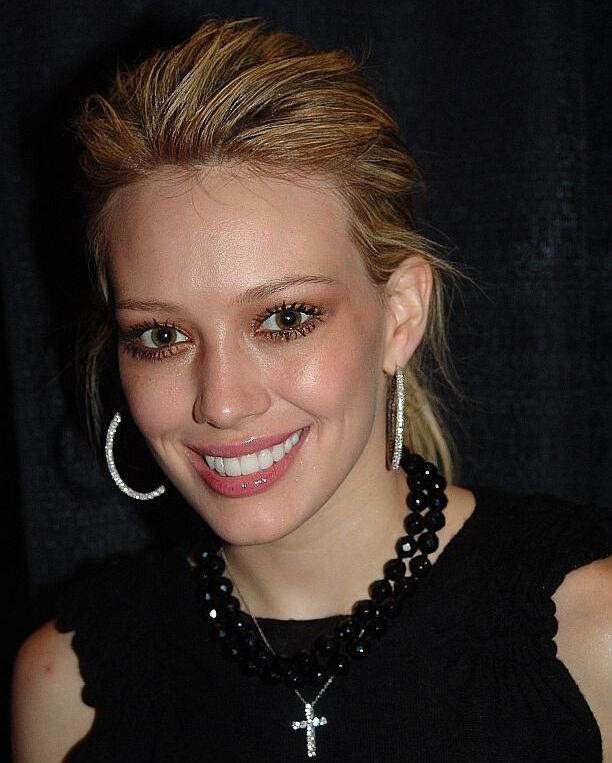
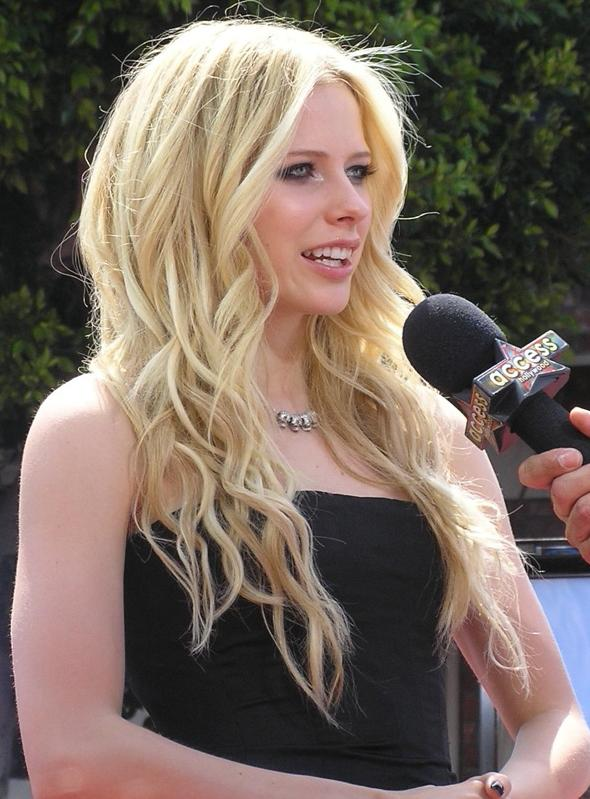
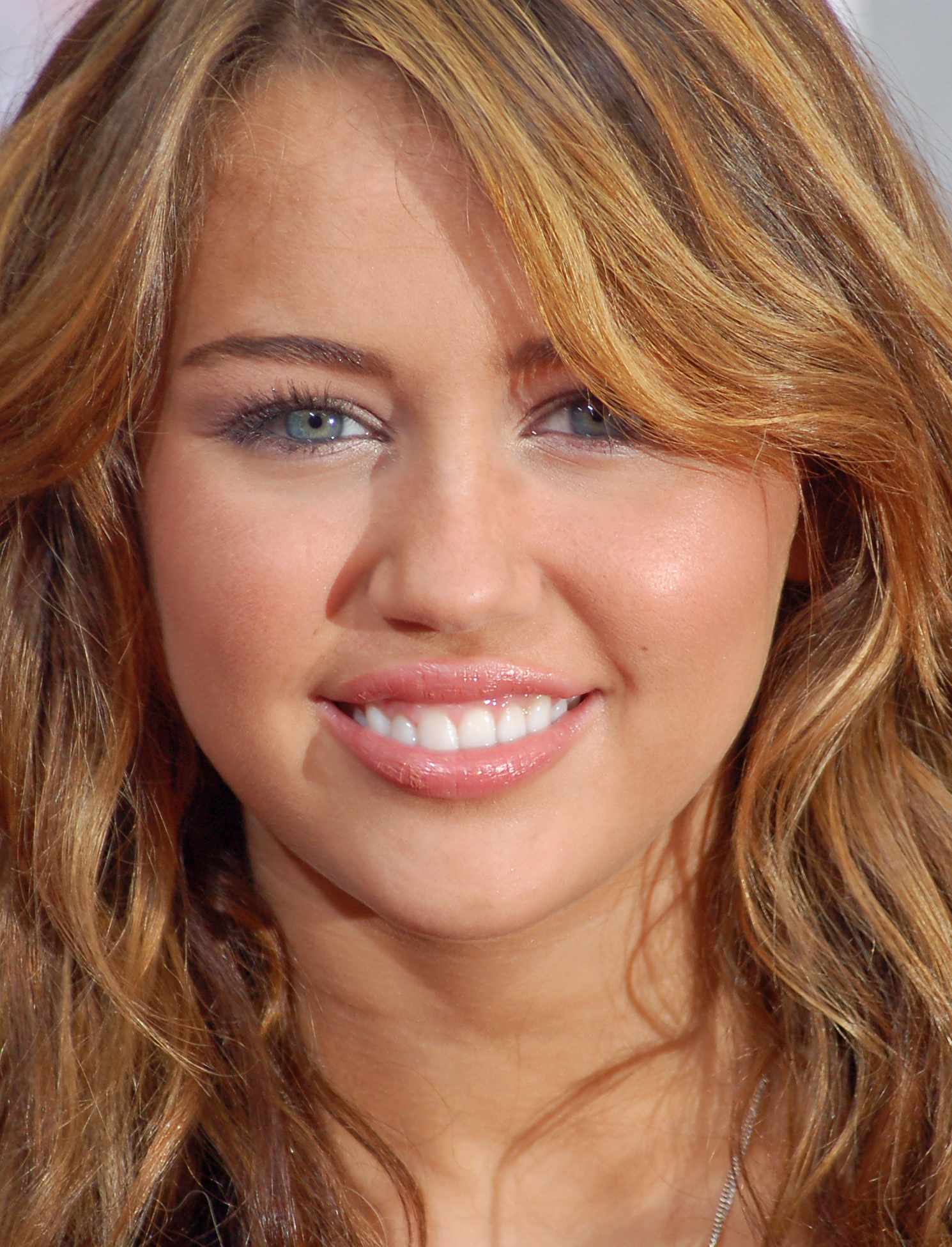
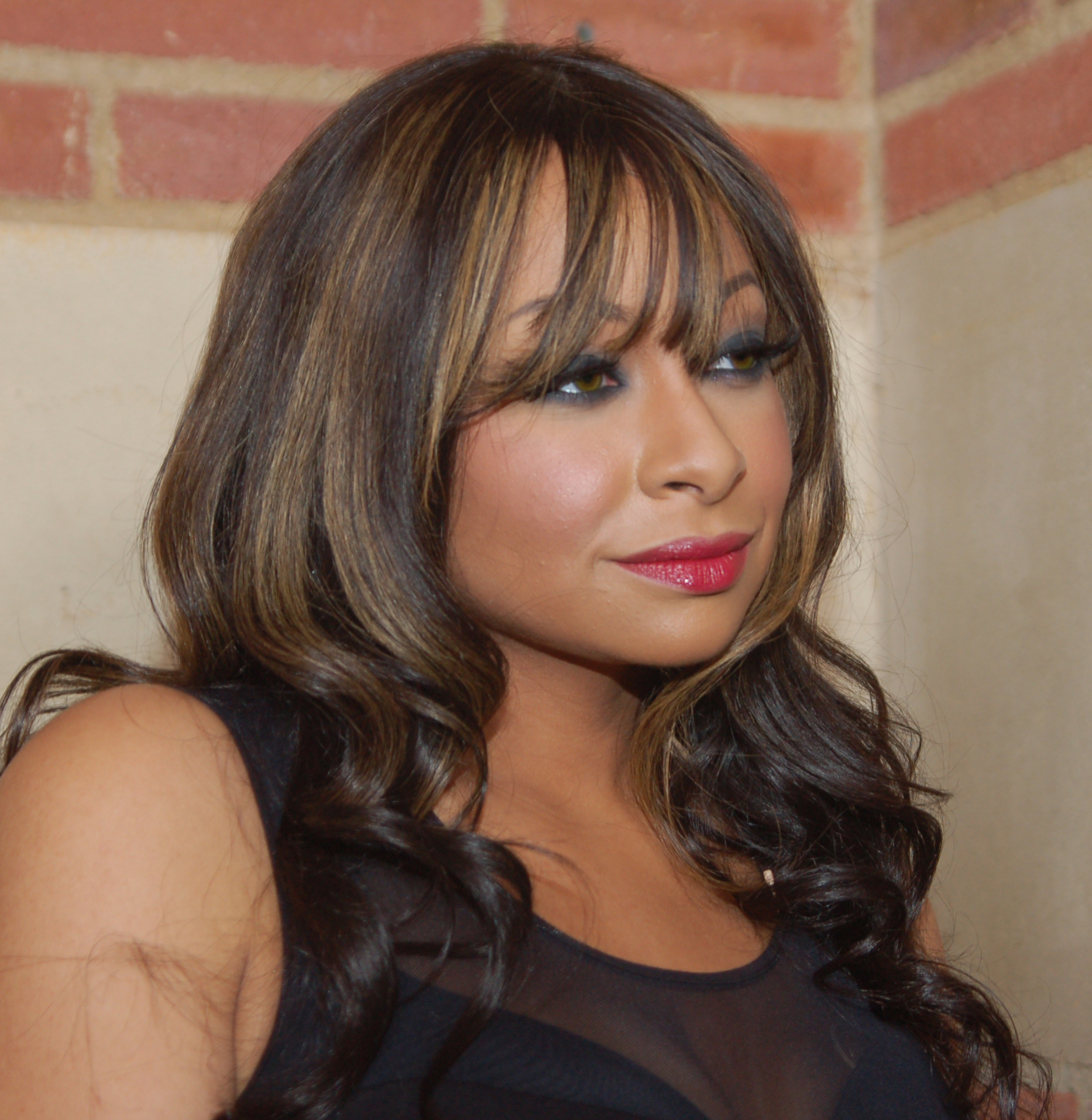
(From left to right) Hilary Duff, Avril Lavigne, Miley Cyrus and Raven-Symoné became teen idols in the early to mid 2000s.

Beginning with the careers of actresses and singers Hilary Duff and Raven-Symoné, the Walt Disney Company cultivated many Disney Channel favorites into becoming teen idols of the time. Mean Girls (2004), a well-known comedy written by Tina Fey, featured the performances of Rachel McAdams and Amanda Seyfried (in her first role).

Miley Cyrus claimed her fame by playing a fictionalized version of herself on the television show Hannah Montana (2006–2011), a great commercial success, which led to profitable sales of albums and merchandise. Her 2009 singles "The Climb" and "Party in the U.S.A" were both mega crossover hits. However, as she began metamorphosizing into something more mature, her popularity fell as parents considered her new materials inappropriate for their children. During the 2020s, however, Hannah Montana was popular among girls of Generation Alpha, even though the show ended before they were even born.

Selena Gomez had her breakthrough when starring in the Disney situational comedy Wizards of Waverly Place (2007–2012) and released her first album Kiss & Tell in 2009. She became an icon for adolescent girls and women, yet details of her personal life put her under public scrutiny.

Demi Lovato made her Disney Channel debut in short show As the Bell Rings (2007-2008) and later in the musical film Camp Rock. She released her first album, Don't Forget, in 2008, before starring in the series Sonny with a Chance (2009–2011). She became an icon for teenagers by addressing issues related to mental health.

After starring in the massively popular High School Musical film franchise, Zac Efron and Vanessa Hudgens entered the public consciousness.

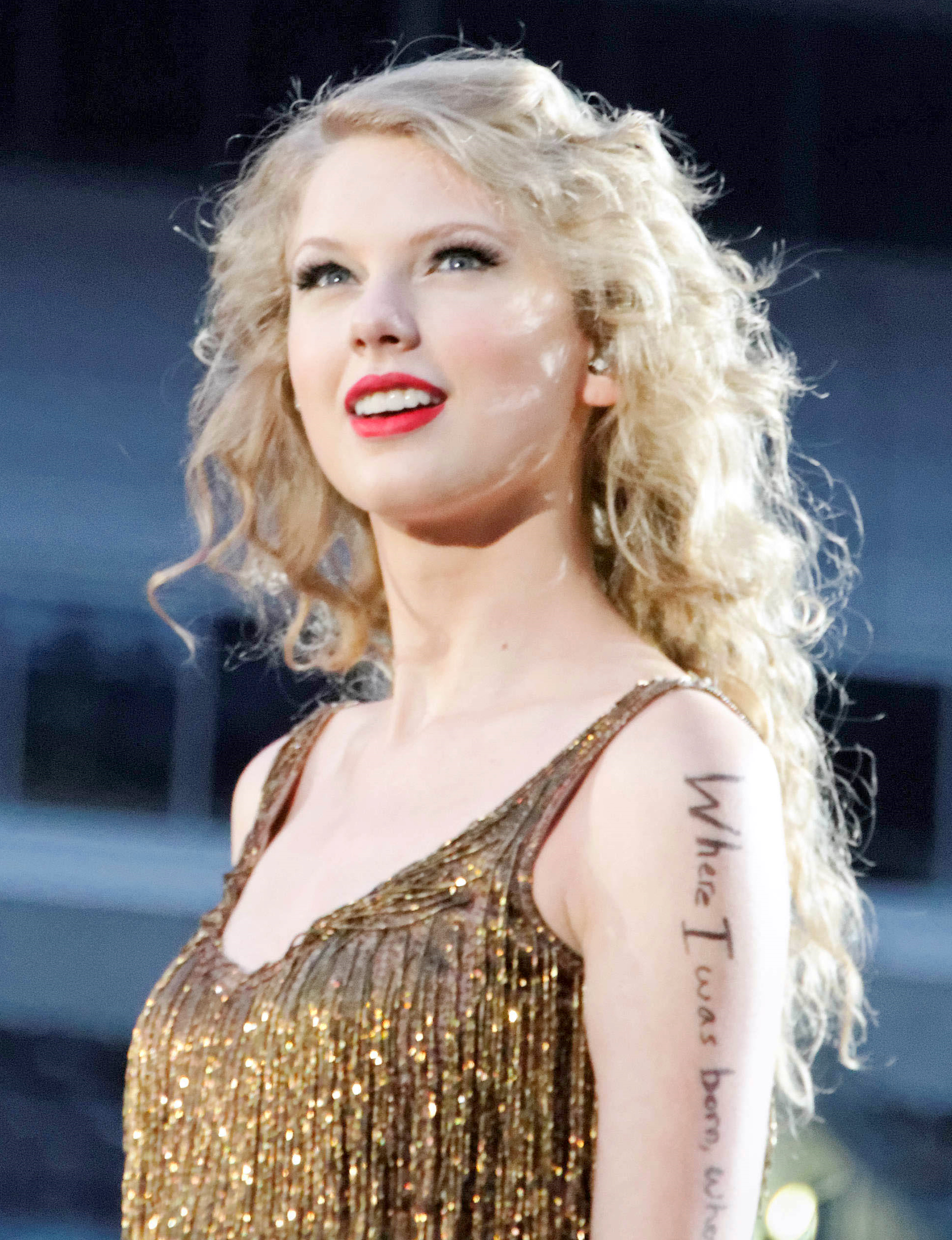
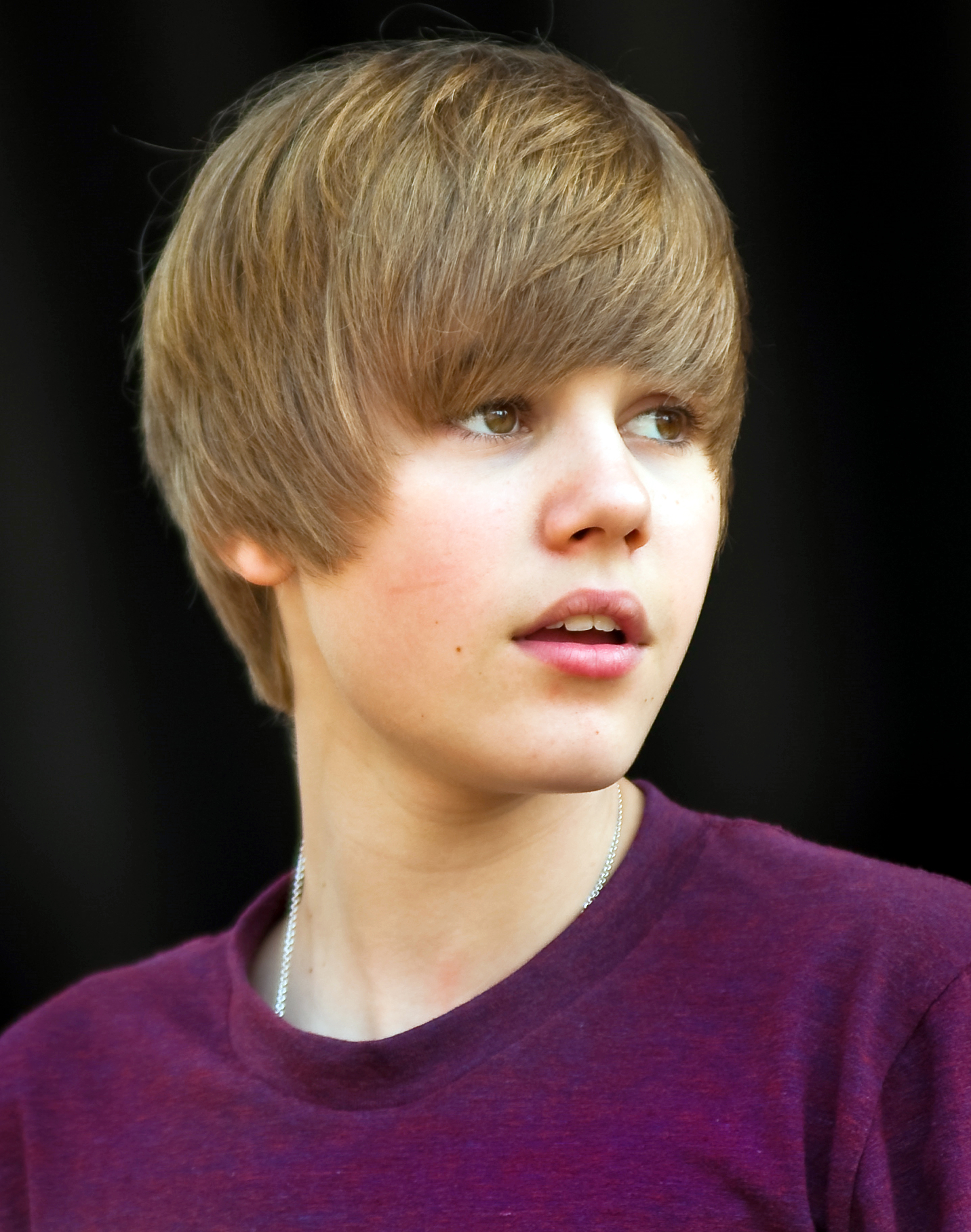
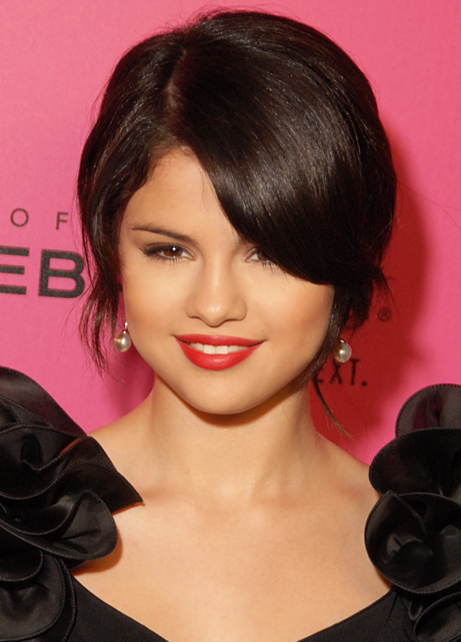
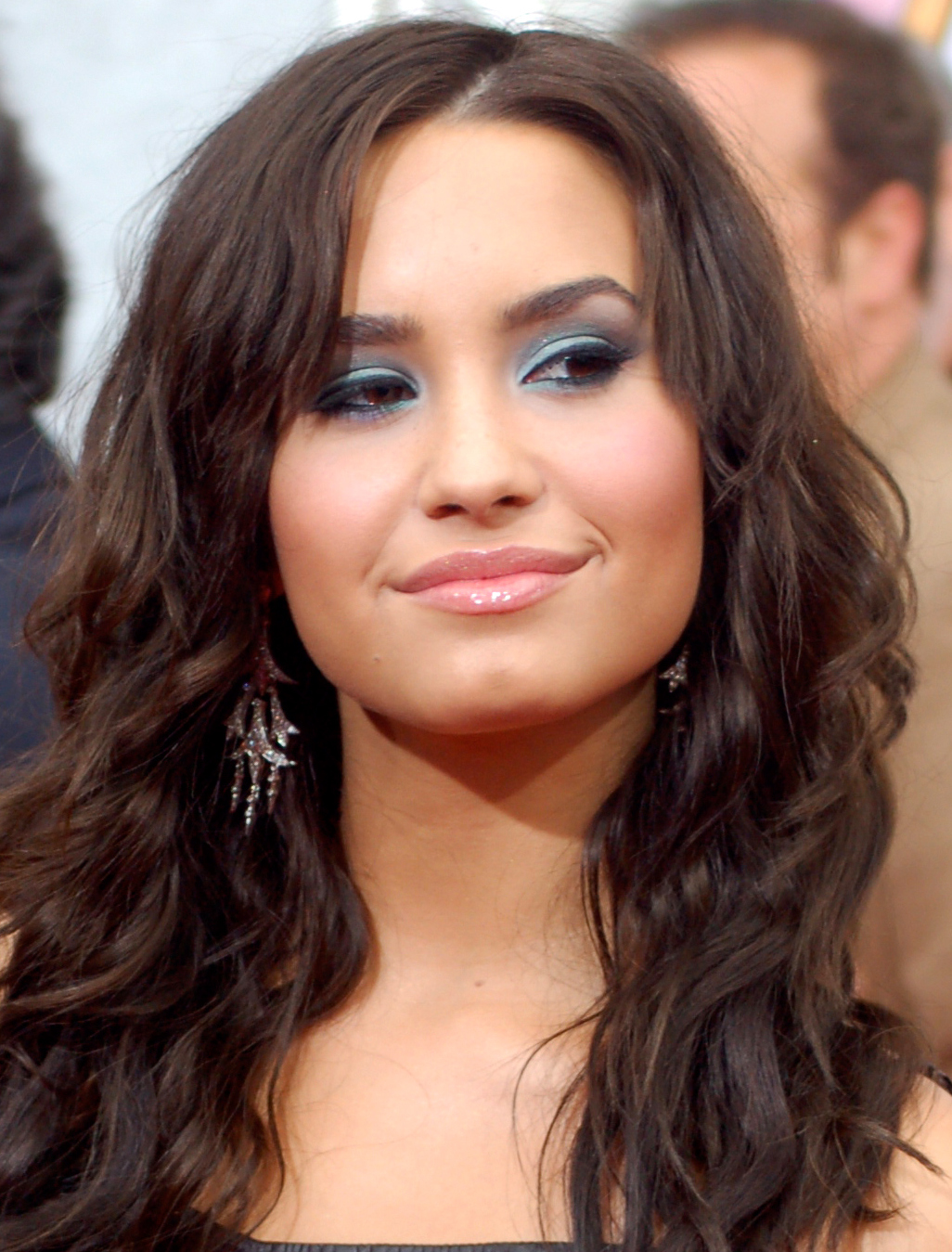
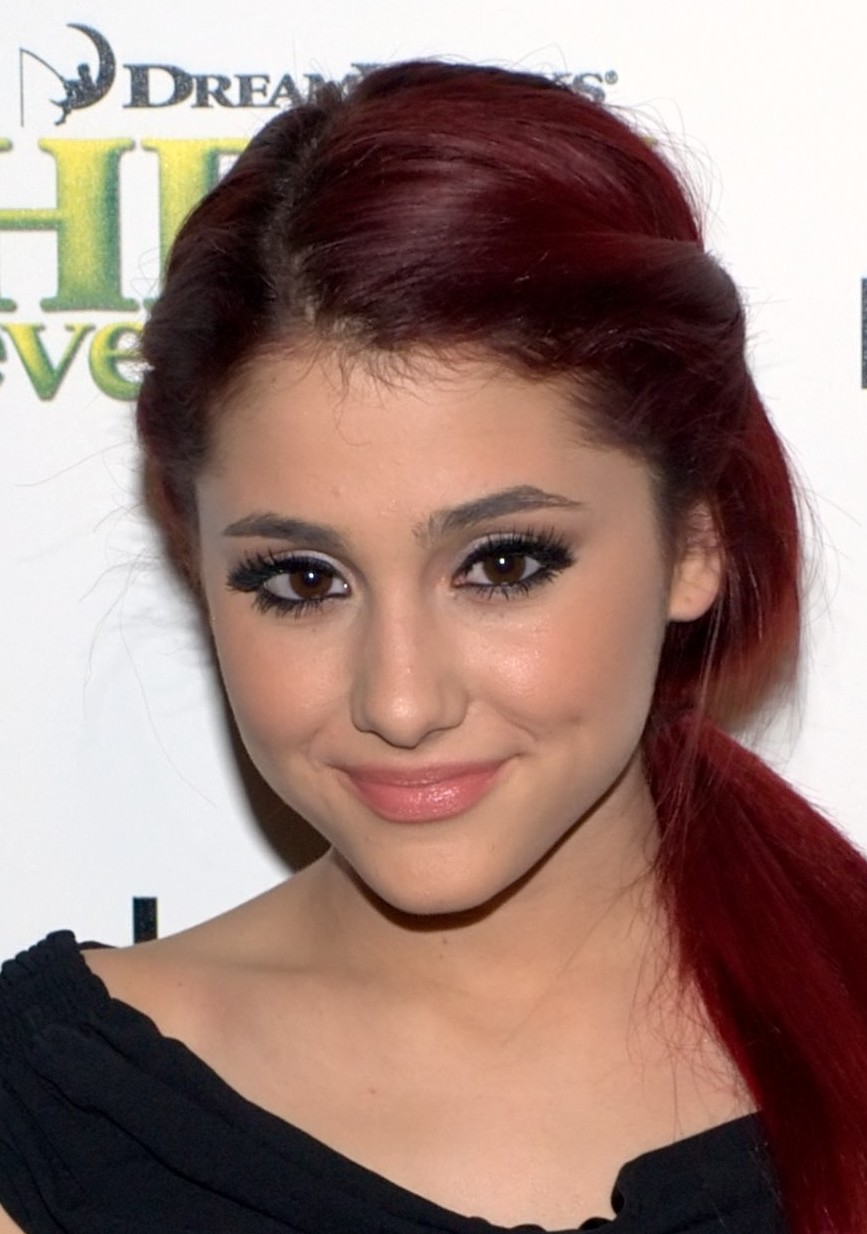
(From left to right) Taylor Swift, Justin Bieber, Selena Gomez, Demi Lovato and Ariana Grande became teen idols in the late 2000s.

In 2002, Canadian singer Avril Lavigne dominated the music scene and eventually became a worldwide teen idol. Listed at #4 on Yahoo!'s Top 25 Teen Idols of all-time.

American musician Taylor Swift entered the scene at age 16 by co-writing the song "Tim McGraw" with Liz Rose in 2005, after which she became a well-known and successful artist as well as a teen idol.

Amanda Bynes dominated the teen comedy and sketch comedy scene in the early 2000s, garnering major roles in movies and her own popular network shows.

Before reaching the age of 20, Ariana Grande had already been popular among secondary schoolchildren by starring in the teen comedy show Victorious (2010–2013) on Nickelodeon. She left acting for singing, and although her singing career had a difficult start, she did capture the attention of producer and songwriter Max Martin, who had worked with many successful artists before. Numerous other stars made also their debut on Nickelodeon, then a popular children's television channel. In the late 2000s, Miranda Cosgrove and Jennette McCurdy, the main stars of iCarly (2007-2012), rose to prominence as two recognizable faces on television for younger audiences.

Discovered on YouTube by media entrepreneur Scooter Braun at the age of 13, Justin Bieber was ushered into fame with his 2009 album My World.

=== 2010s ===
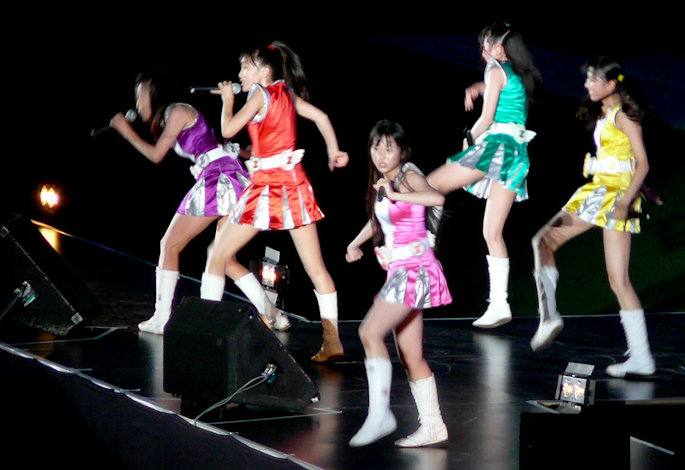
Momoiro Clover

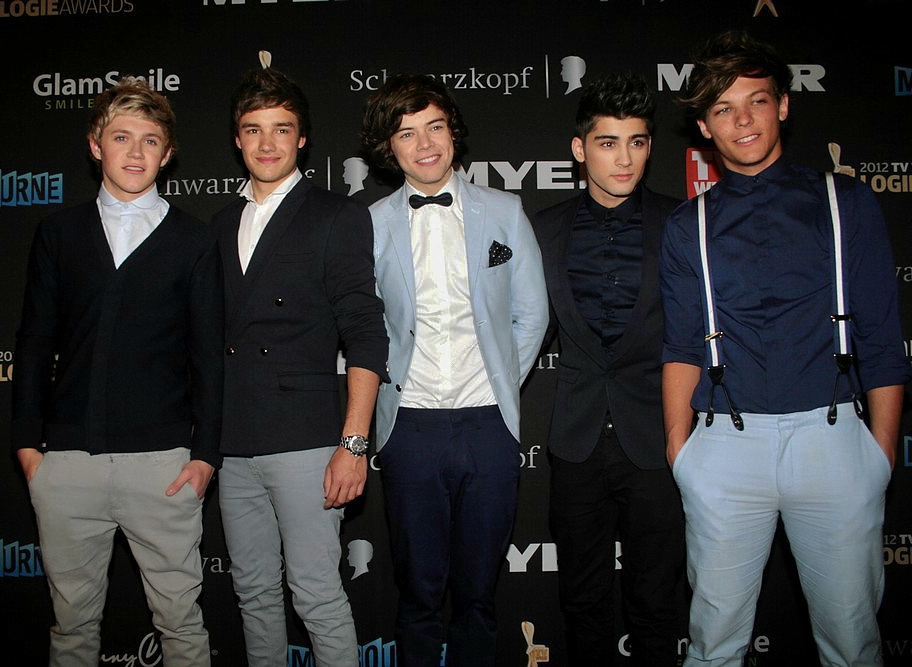
One Direction

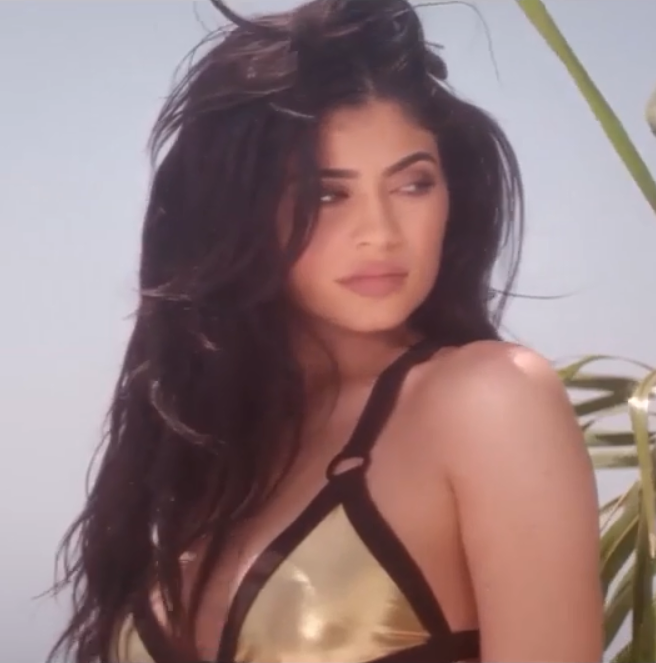
Kylie Jenner

Zendaya is recognized for her ascent from Disney's Shake It Up to global stardom, and Time Magazine named her one of the most influential teenagers of 2015.

In Japan, more and more Japanese idol groups have appeared. In Japanese culture, persons called "idols" are media personalities in their teens and early twenties who are considered particularly attractive or cute and who will, for a period ranging from several months to a few years, regularly appear in the mass media, e.g. as singers for pop groups, bit-part actors, TV personalities, models in photo spreads published in magazines, advertisements, etc. One of the most successful groups is Momoiro Clover Z. Their performances incorporate elements of ballet, gymnastics, and action movies. During 2014, about 486,000 people attended their live concerts, which was the highest record of all female musicians in Japan. Momoiro Clover Z has been ranked as one of the most popular female idol groups from 2013 to 2017.

Victoria Justice was the ultimate "teen queen" of the early 2010s, serving as the face of Nickelodeon's flagship program Victorious.

In the late 2010s, many young actors developed large followings amongst teenagers after portraying famous contemporary literary characters. The most notable among these were Ansel Elgort (Augustus Waters), Timothée Chalamet (Elio Perlman), and Nick Robinson (Simon Spier). These actors were referred to by the media and general public as "White Boys of the Month", with the term becoming a popular meme since. Noah Centineo became popular among teenagers and young adults following the release of To All the Boys I've Loved Before, having amassed over 15 million Instagram followers within eight weeks of the film's release; he was dubbed an "internet boyfriend" by the media.

Although the future members of the boy band One Direction got elimated as solo acts on the third season of The X Factor, guest judge Nicole Scherzinger suggested that they form a group together. The result was much fame and fortune for the band, who burst onto the scene in 2012. The group went on indefinite hiatus in 2016, and since 2017, its members have been pursuing solo projects. Similarly, in 2016, the Cuban-born American singer Camila Cabello left the girl group Fifth Harmony, which went on indefinite hiatus in 2018, in order to pursue a solo career. She makes use of her Latin American heritage in her rhythms.

Kylie Jenner rising to prominence in the mid-2010s can be attributed to several factors. Firstly, her appearances on her family's hit TV series Keeping Up with the Kardashians gave her a platform to showcase her unique personality and relatable experiences. Additionally, her bold and ever-changing sense of fashion, coupled with her flawless makeup looks, made her a style icon for many teenagers. Moreover, her active presence on social media platforms like Instagram and Snapchat allowed her to connect with her fan base on a more personal level, giving them a glimpse into her glamorous lifestyle. In 2014 and 2015, she was named among Time magazine's 100 most influential people in the world citing her considerable influence among youth on social media. Kylie's influence in the beauty industry with her lip kits and cosmetics brand Kylie Cosmetics also contributed to her teen idol status.

At age 18, American musician Billie Eilish won four Grammy Awards in 2020, and was commissioned to perform the theme song for the James Bond movie No Time to Die (2021). The song topped the charts in February 2020. She wrote it with her brother, Finneas, becoming the youngest artist to do so. She has hundreds of millions of followers on social media, and is well known for her lyrics concerning mental health issues such as depression and anxiety.

Millie Bobby Brown rose to fame at age 12 from her role as Eleven in the Netflix series Stranger Things (2016–2025). Her peer co-stars on the show – Finn Wolfhard, Gaten Matarazzo, Caleb McLaughlin, Noah Schnapp, and Sadie Sink – also achieved fame from their roles.

=== 2020s ===
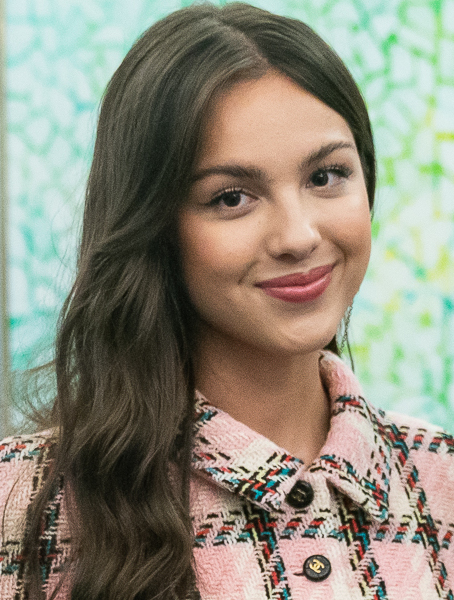
Olivia Rodrigo in 2021

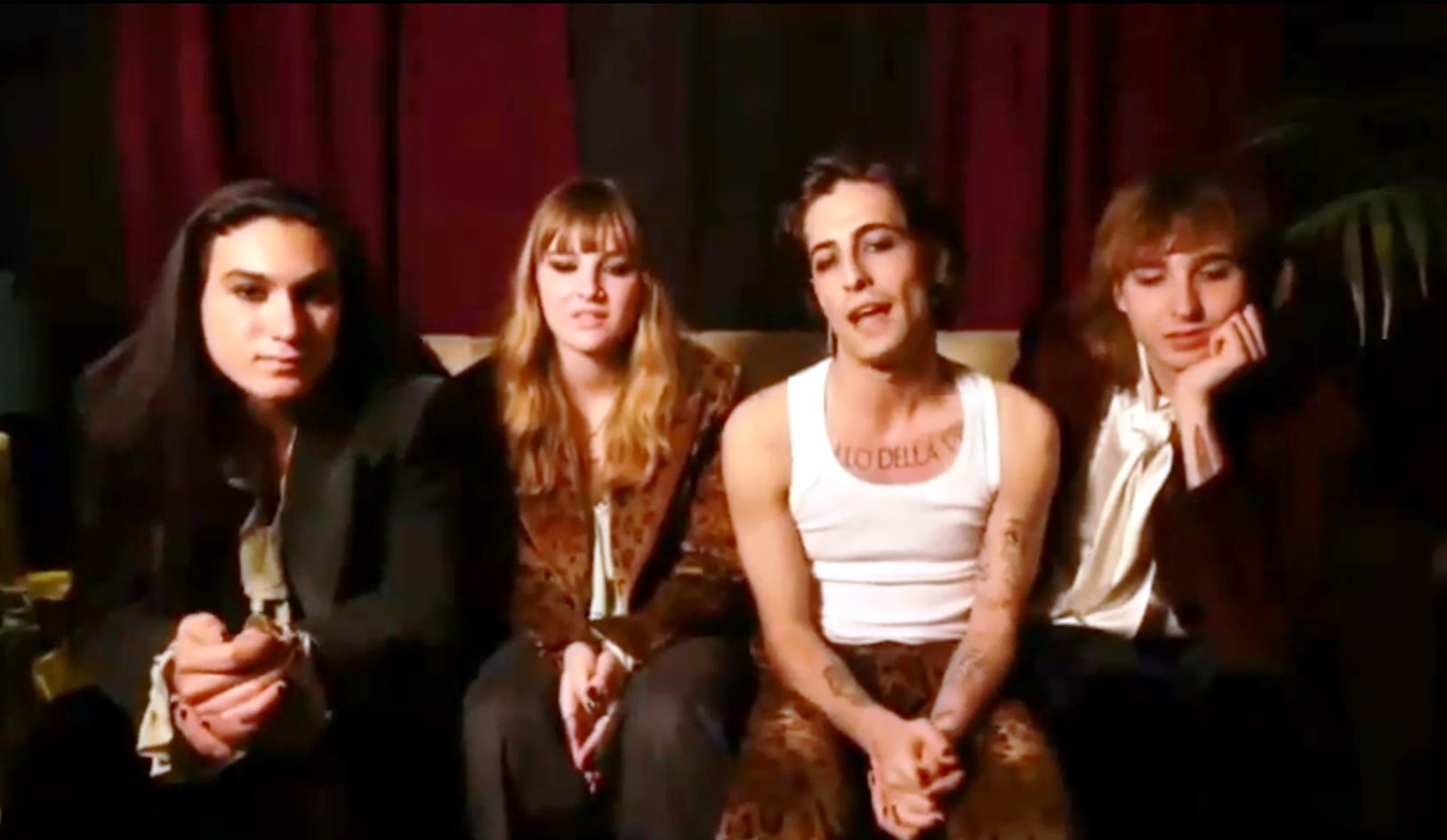
Måneskin in 2021

American artist Olivia Rodrigo had previously worked as a child actress on the Disney comedy series Bizaardvark (2016–19) and starred in the first three seasons of High School Musical: The Musical: The Series (2019–22). In January 2021, she released her debut single, "Drivers License", which went on to become one of the most streamed songs on Spotify at the time and spent eight weeks on top of the Billboard Hot 100 chart. She sings with profanities in an emotionally charged manner of the struggles of an adolescent and commands a large following on social media networks, including TikTok, where she has many teen-aged supporters. Some sources consider Rodrigo to be a representative of Generation Z.

Italian rock band Måneskin was ushered into international attention after winning the Eurovision Song Contest 2021, with their winning track "Zitti e buoni" as well as "I Wanna Be Your Slave" and their cover of The Four Seasons' "Beggin'" reaching the top 10 on the Billboard Global Excl. U.S. chart, supported by a growing following on TikTok and other social media platforms. Prior to their Eurovision win, the band finished as runner-up in the eleventh season of the Italian X Factor in 2017. Måneskin are credited as one of the first rock bands to heavily appeal to Generation Z.

== Impact and influence ==
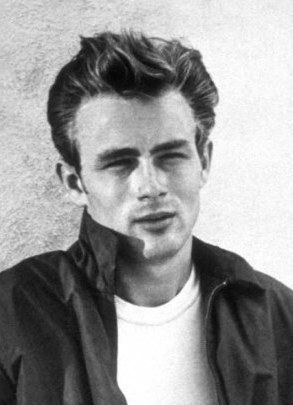
James Dean in Rebel Without a Cause (1955)

In the West, the Beatles, Bob Dylan, and the Rolling Stones were extremely popular among the Baby Boomers when they were growing up. Parents, by contrast, saw their influence greatly diminished. In the United Kingdom, for instance, a combination of the Lady Chatterley trial (1959) and the first long-play of the Beatles, Please Please Me (1963) triggered a change public perception of human mating, a cause subsequently taken up by young people seeking sexual liberation. (Note: See this 1974 poem by the poet Philip Larkin.)

During the 1960s and 1970s, the music industry made a fortune selling rock records to people between the ages of fourteen and twenty-five. This era was home to many youthful stars—people like Brian Jones of the Rolling Stones or Jimi Hendrix—who had lifestyles that all but guaranteed early deaths. (Note: Also see life-history theory.) The death of a (former) teen idol can have a serious impact on fans, leading to outbursts of emotions. This was certainly the case when people like Davy Jones or Michael Jackson died. And if an artist who reached fame at a young age were to die prematurely, he or she could spark conversations about the cost of fame. This has been a recurring theme following the deaths of Amy Winehouse (at age 27), Avicii (at 28), or Liam Payne (aged 31). These stars lacked a stable home environment, had an extremely busy and stressful schedule, were exposed to an adult environment as a teenager, face frequent and intense public scrutiny, and were prone to alcoholism or substance abuse. Their deaths also fuel the myth that such endings are common among talented musicians, an idea that could be traced back to the antique world. In the fourth century B.C., Greek playwright Menander claimed, "Whom the Gods love die young." But the myth that they die at the age of 27 is a modern phenomenon. Statistical analysis has debunked this myth; there is no peak risk of dying at around age 27 for famous individuals, even if those who die at this specific age may garner more attention. However, famous young artists face an elevated risk of dying in their 20s and 30s relative to the general population. In the United Kingdom, the risk is two to three times higher.

But even as their fans age, the audience of idols does not necessarily shrink, as the fans who became parents can introduce their children to their music. People tend to be nostalgic about music from their youth. In the twenty-first century, (former) teen idols can continue to be highly successful years after they made their debut as can be seen from the number of streams, digital downloads, CDs, cassettes, and vinyl records shipped. To-date, the Beatles remain one of the best-selling bands of all times. Their success is unlikely to be replicated in the twenty-first century because trends have much shorter lifetimes and musical genres have splintered. Michael (2026), a biopic of Michael Jackson, earned $97 million during its opening week, a record for movies of its kind.

The charm and charisma manifested by American actor James Dean onscreen proved strongly appealing to the audience, and his persona of youthful rebellion provided a template for succeeding generations of youth to model themselves on. Various artists, including Leonardo DiCaprio, Buddy Holly, and David Bowie, cited Dean as an influence. Musician Taylor Swift referenced him in "Style" (2014). Meanwhile, wearing white T-shirts and jeans remains iconic among young people today.

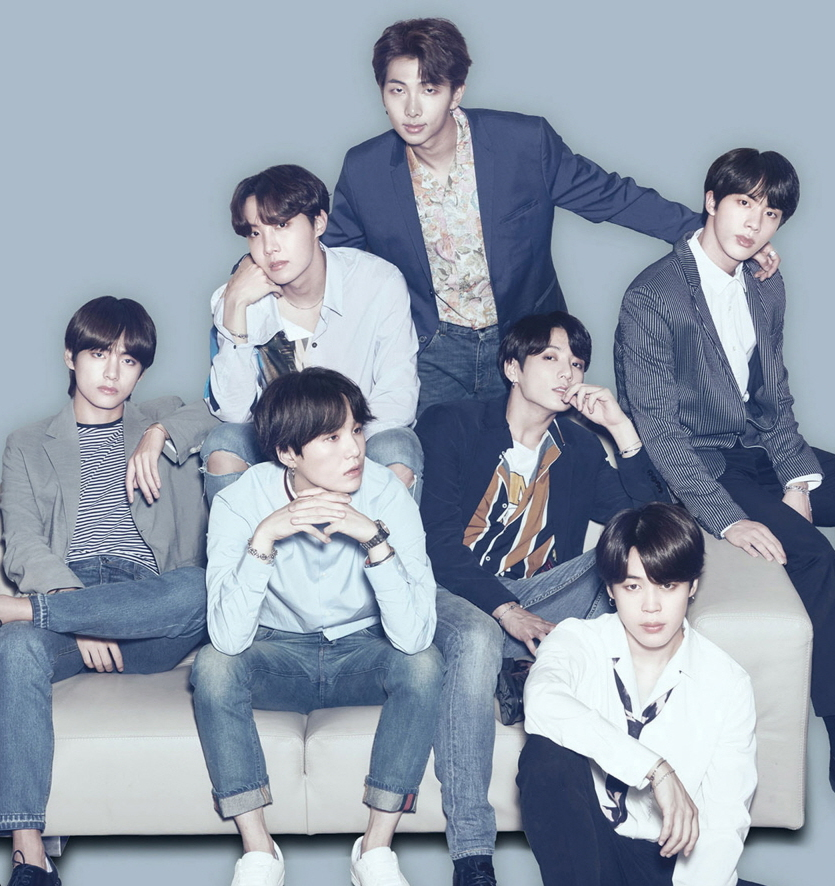
BTS (pictured 2018) were found to be a valuable music act for the South Korean economy.

The K-pop band Girls' Generation has generally been considered as a cultural icon of not just South Korea, but also a part of the Korean Wave, the rising popularity of Korean culture on the international stage. Despite its largely apolitical lyrics, their song "Into the New World" (2007) was used various youth protests around the world, such as pro-democratic rallies in Hong Kong in 2019–20 as well as in Thailand in 2020-21. As of 2019, another K-pop band, BTS, was reportedly worth more than US$4.65 billion, or 0.3 percent of the GDP of their home country. They attracted one in every 13 foreign visitors to South Korea and were cited as one of the key acts in boosting global music sales to US$19 billion in 2018. When BTS returned in 2026 after their members had completed their mandatory military service, their concert tickets quickly sold out.

A 2023 report by the Federal Reserve estimated that Taylor Swift's Eras Tour was responsible for $4.6 billion of consumer spending in the United States alone; local economies were significantly boosted by her presence. Besides the Fed, various state and local authorities have credited Swift with increasing demand for their tourism and hospitality industries, despite the slow recovery following the COVID-19 pandemic. During the early 2020s, a number of American universities offered courses pertaining to Taylor Swift, her music, and her cultural impact. Her album 1989 (2014) was inducted to the National Recording Registry of the U.S. Library of Congress in 2026. Taylor Swift is also seen as a positive role model for young people on prosocial behavior and on dealing with body-image issues and unrealistic cultural expectations.

== See also ==
- Celebrity worship syndrome
- Idolization
- Junior idol
- K-Pop idol
- Korean Wave
- Matinee idol
- MTV Generation
- Pin-up
- Sex symbol
- Teen pop
- Youth culture

== Book sources ==
- Heller, Steven (1998). Teenage Confidential: An Illustrated History of the American Teen. Chronicle Books. ISBN 978-0-8118-1584-0.
- Straubhaar, Joseph (1997). Communications Media in the Information Society. Wadsworth Publishing Company. ISBN 978-0-534-52128-8.
