= Idolization =

Intense admiration for another person

Idolization refers to the process by which an individual (an idolizer) develops an intense admiration or fixation on another person (the idolized). The idolized figure may be a celebrity, a prominent figure in sports or media, or a personally known individual regarded as a role model.

Idolization is a widespread social and psychological phenomenon, particularly associated with childhood and adolescence. During these developmental stages, individuals often seek to establish a sense of identity by associating with figures perceived to possess desirable traits or social recognition. Idols may emerge from a wide range of social domains, including sports, mass media, and music, and can become powerful objects of devotion.

Although idolization is common and often regarded as a normal developmental phase, scholarly perspectives vary regarding its significance. Some researchers view it as a transient and relatively benign aspect of development, while others emphasize its potential influence, both positively and negatively, on values, attitudes, and behavior.

== Developmental role ==
Idolization typically begins in childhood and is considered a normal component of identity formation. Children in middle childhood or earlier frequently engage in idolization, including admiration of both personally known figures and public personalities. It varies according to age, gender, and cultural context. It tends to peak in late childhood and early adolescence and decline thereafter. In this context, idols function as exemplars of social and physical ideals. Children and adolescents may model their beliefs, aspirations, and behaviors on admired figures, incorporating perceived traits such as success, attractiveness, or competence into their own developing self-concept. This process often involves imitation of behaviors and lifestyles, including fashion, career ambitions, and social attitudes.

In developmental psychology, idolization has been described as serving a role analogous to a secondary attachment, enabling adolescents to shift emotional reliance away from parents while exploring identity and autonomy. Idolized figures may contribute to self-expression, the development of independence, and a sense of psychological well-being. Studies have identified gender differences in patterns of idolization, including variation in the types of figures admired and the roles those figures play in identity development.

Idolization may also be shaped by immediate social environments. Exposure to idols is frequently mediated by family members or peers, and individuals may be introduced to admired figures through siblings, relatives, or social networks.

Idolization may also influence adolescent social relationships more broadly. Idols can function as quasi-peers, contributing to feelings of belonging and shaping expectations regarding friendships and romantic relationships. Shared idolization of the same figure can serve as a bonding mechanism for people who form fan clubs or other such groups dedicated to the support of the idolized figure.

== Psychological and social effects ==
Idolization can influence behavior, attitudes, and identity formation. Individuals frequently use idols as sources of motivation and guidance, particularly during adolescence. Idols may serve as models for imitation and as sources of knowledge about relationships, social roles, and personal aspirations. At moderate levels, idolization may actually contribute positively to development, supporting identity exploration and social learning, particularly where idolization is encouraged with respect to persons publicly perceived as having positive characteristics like honesty, diligence, or courage. Scholars have also noted potential risks associated with idolization, particularly when it involves uncritical imitation or exposure to harmful behaviors modeled by public figures. Media coverage of celebrity actions has, in some cases, been associated with imitative behaviors among audiences.

High levels of idolization have been associated with negative self-image, including body dissatisfaction and problematic eating attitudes, particularly among children and adolescents. In addition, higher rates of idolization have been correlated with insecure family environments. In extreme cases, idolization becomes maladaptive with excessive admiration developing into obsession, potentially impairing the ability of an individual to perceive the idolized figure realistically or as a fully human individual. While idolization itself is not generally indicative of psychological disorder, unusually intense forms may reflect underlying emotional or developmental issues and can provide insight into the psychological state of the individual. Among the phenomena noted to correlate with idolization is an increased suicide rate following the suicide of a celebrity figure.

== Media and consumer culture ==
The concept of idolization is longstanding, as is criticism of the practice. As early as 1765, a letter to the London newspaper, The Public Advertiser, advised that Englishmen traveling to France were "not so prone to the Idolization of Foreigners" that they would go there to pursue French women. A 1921 editorial in the Springfield Weekly Republican lamented the trend of idolization of entertainment and sports stars, pointing to the then-developing Fatty Arbuckle scandal. Such calls for stepping back from the idolization of celebrities have continued into the twenty-first century.

Modern forms of idolization are closely linked to media and consumer culture. The admiration of celebrities is often expressed through the acquisition of merchandise associated with the idol, such as recordings, clothing, or memorabilia. Items directly connected to celebrities, including autographed objects, may acquire elevated symbolic and monetary value. Mass media environments also play a central role in shaping idolization by increasing exposure to public figures and facilitating ongoing engagement with their personas. Idolization is often embedded in broader systems of commercialization, with fandom being expressed through consumption and idols being made into marketable commodities through branding of paraphernalia. Contemporary research emphasizes the role of social media in shaping and reinforcing idolization, with digital platforms providing curated and highly selective representations of public figures, often presenting idealized images of their lives. Adolescents, in particular, are prone to interpreting these representations as authentic reflections of personality and character.

== See also ==
- Anti-fan
- Celebrity worship syndrome
- Idealization and devaluation
- Idolatry
- Matinée idol
- Sasaeng fan
- Stan (fan)
- Teen idol
