= Celebrity worship syndrome =

Disorder involving obsession with celebrities

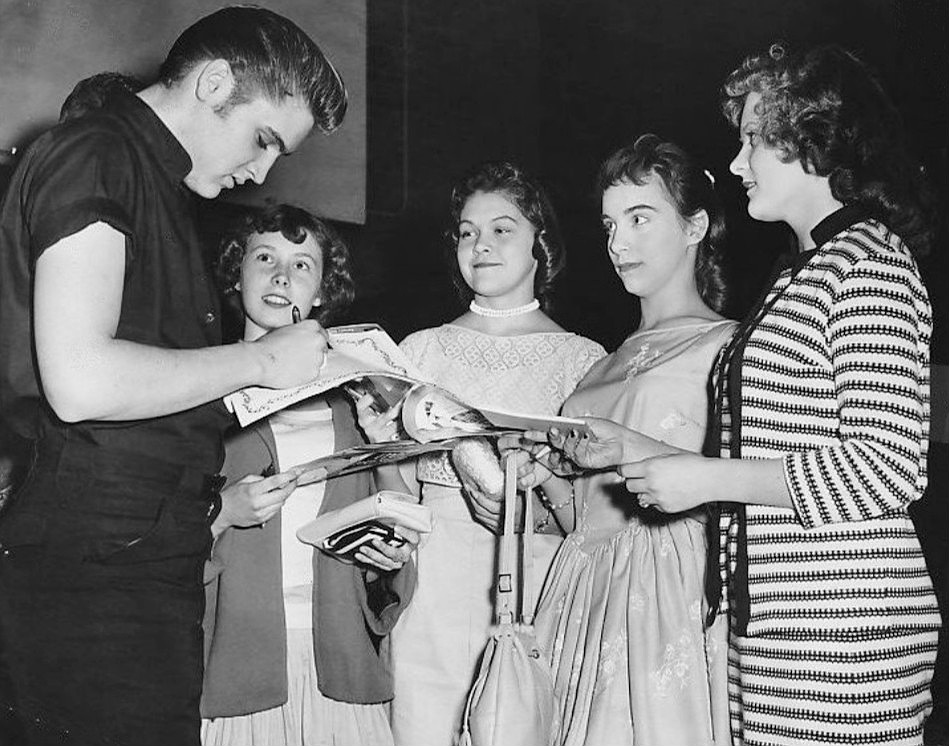
Elvis Presley signing autographs for young female fans in Minneapolis, Minnesota in June 1956. Photo taken by The Minneapolis Tribune reporter Powell F. Krueger

Celebrity worship syndrome (CWS) is an obsessive addictive disorder in which a person becomes overly involved with the details of a celebrity's personal and professional life. Psychologists have indicated that though many people obsess over film, television, sport and music stars, the only common factor between them is that they are all figures in the public eye. Written observations of celebrity worship date back to the 19th century.

== Classifications ==
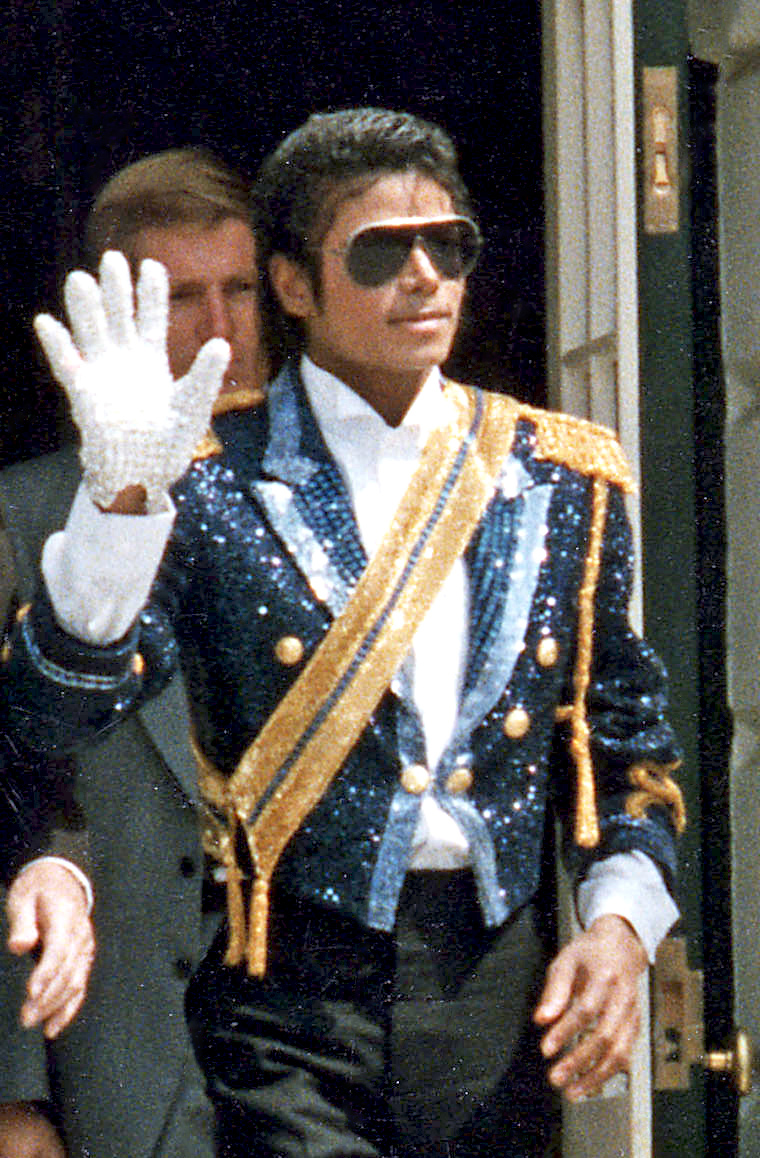
Michael Jackson at the White House. Jackson has been considered one of the prime examples of celebrity worship, both during his lifetime and after his death.

=== Entertainment-social ===
This level of admiration is linked to a celebrity's ability to capture the attention of their fans. Entertainment-social celebrity worship is used to describe a relatively low level of obsession. An example of a typical entertainment-social attitude would be "My friends and I like to discuss what my favorite celebrity has done." It may also be seen in the form of obsessively following celebrities on social media, although considered the lowest level of celebrity worship. It has been seen to have a number of negative effects with regards the development of unhealthy eating tendencies (eating disorders), anxiety, depression, poor body image and low self esteem, especially in young adolescents aged 13 to mid-20s. This can be supported by a study carried out on a group of female adolescents between the ages of 17–20.

=== Intense-personal ===
This is an intermediate level of obsession that is associated with neuroticism as well as behaviors linked to psychoticism. An example of an intense-personal attitude toward a celebrity would include claims such as "I consider my favorite celebrity to be my soul mate." It has been found that in particular, people who worship celebrities in this manner often have low self-esteem with regards to their body type, especially if they think that the celebrity is physically attractive. The effects of intense-personal celebrity worship on body image are seen in some cases of cosmetic surgery. Females who have high levels of obsession are more accepting of cosmetic surgery than those who do not obsess over celebrities to this extent.

=== Love obsessional ===
As the name suggests, individuals who demonstrate this sort of stalking behavior develop a love obsession with somebody who they have no personal relation to. Love obsessional stalking accounts for roughly 20–25% of all stalking cases. The people that demonstrate this form of stalking behavior are likely to have a mental disorder, commonly either schizophrenia or paranoia. Individuals that are love obsessional stalkers often convince themselves that they are in fact in a relationship with the subject of their obsession. For example, a woman who had been stalking David Letterman for a total of five years claimed to be his wife when she had no personal connection to him. Other celebrities who have fallen victim to this form of stalking include Jennifer Aniston, Halle Berry, Jodie Foster, and Mila Kunis, along with numerous other A-list stars.

=== Erotomanic ===
Erotomanic, originating from the word erotomania, refers to stalkers who genuinely believe that their victims are in love with them. The victims in this case are almost always well known within their community or within the media, meaning that they can range from small-town celebrities to famous personalities from Hollywood. Comprising less than 10% of all stalking cases, erotomanic stalkers are the least common. Unlike simple-obsessional stalkers, a majority of the individuals in this category of stalking are women. Similar to love-obsessional stalkers, the behavior of erotomanic stalkers may be a result of an underlying psychological disorder such as schizophrenia, bipolar disorder, or major depression.

Individuals who have erotomania tend to believe that the celebrity with whom they are obsessed with is utilizing the media as a way to communicate with them by sending special messages or signals. Although these stalkers have unrealistic beliefs, they are less likely to seek any form of face-to-face interaction with their celebrity obsession, therefore posing less of a threat to them.

=== Borderline-pathological ===
This classification is the most severe level of celebrity worship. It is characterized by pathological attitudes and behaviors as a result of celebrity worship. This includes willingness to commit crime on behalf of the celebrity who is the object of worship, or to spend money on common items used by the celebrity at some point, such as napkins.

== Mental health ==
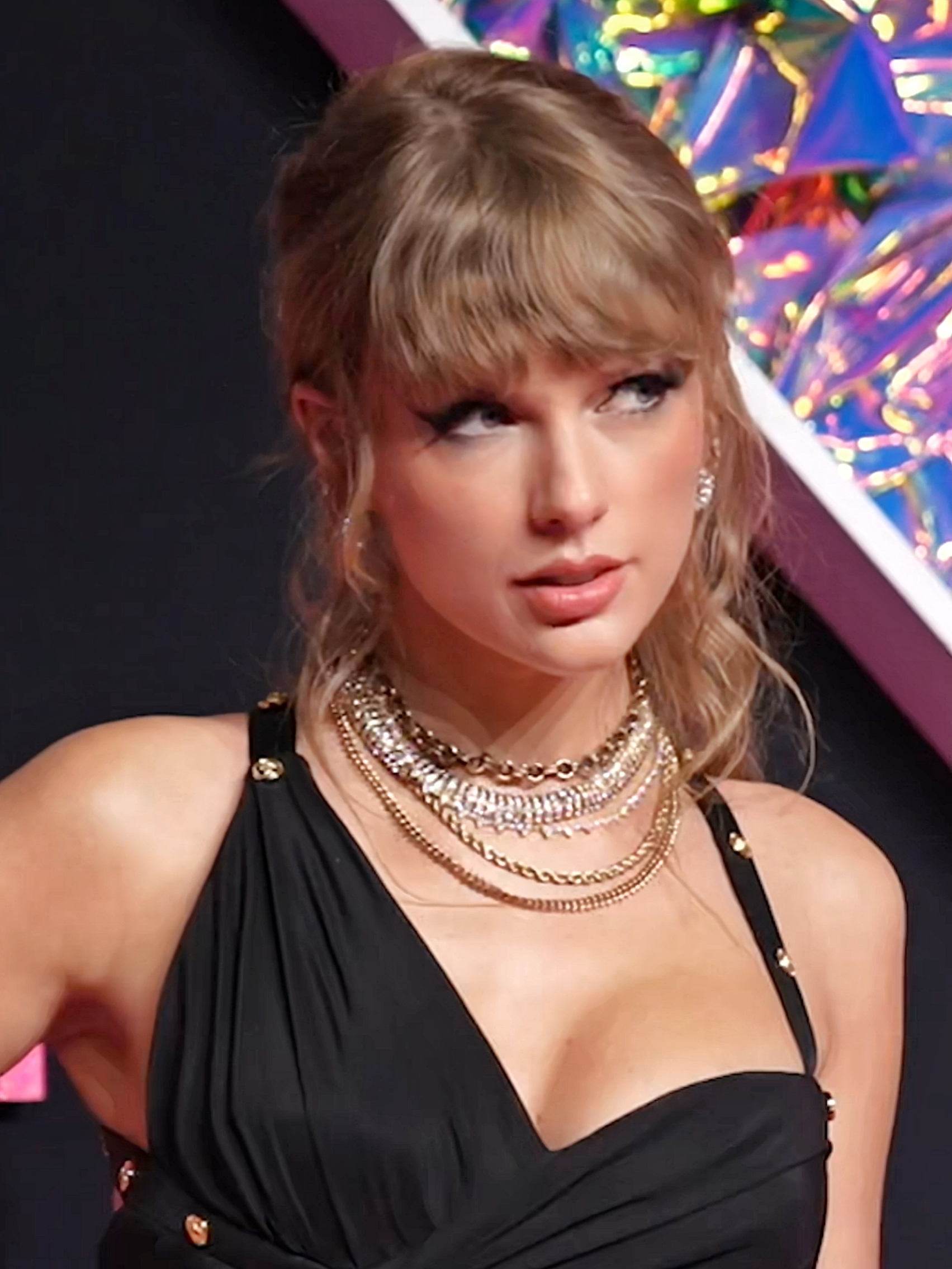
Taylor Swift has had numerous stalkers.

Evidence indicates that poor mental health is correlated with celebrity worship. Researchers have examined the relationship between celebrity worship and mental health in United Kingdom adult samples. One study found evidence to suggest that the intense-personal celebrity worship dimension was related to higher levels of depression and anxiety. Similarly, another study in 2004, found that the intense-personal celebrity worship dimension was not only related to higher levels of depression and anxiety, but also higher levels of stress, negative affect, and reports of illness. Both these studies showed no evidence for a significant relationship between either the entertainment-social or the borderline-pathological dimensions of celebrity worship and mental health.

Another correlated pathology examined the role of celebrity interest in shaping body image cognitions. Among three separate UK samples (adolescents, students, and older adults), individuals selected a celebrity of their own sex whose body/figure they liked and admired, and then completed the Celebrity Attitude Scale along with two measures of body image. Significant relationships were found between attitudes toward celebrities and body image among female adolescents only.

The findings suggested that, in female adolescence, there is an interaction between intense-personal celebrity worship and body image between the ages of 14 and 16. Tentative evidence suggests that this relationship disappears at the onset of adulthood, which is between the ages of 17 and 20. These results are consistent with the authors who stress the importance of the formation of relationships with media figures, and suggest that relationships with celebrities perceived as having a good body shape may lead to a poor body image in female adolescents. This can be again supported by a study carried out, which investigated the link between mass media and its direct correlation to poor self-worth/ body image in a sample group of females between the ages of 17 and 20.

Within a clinical context the effect of celebrity might be more extreme, particularly when considering extreme aspects of celebrity worship. Relationships between the three classifications of celebrity worship (entertainment-social, intense-personal and borderline-pathological celebrity worship and obsessiveness), ego-identity, fantasy proneness and dissociation were examined. Two of these variables drew particular attention: fantasy proneness and dissociation. Fantasy proneness involves fantasizing for a duration of time, reporting hallucinatory intensities as real, reporting vivid childhood memories, having intense religious and paranormal experiences. Dissociation is the lack of a normal integration of experiences, feelings, and thoughts in everyday consciousness and memory; in addition, it is related to a number of psychiatric problems. A review of 62 studies on celebrity worship found a correlation with certain factors, such as cognitive flexibility and critical thinking. However, due to methodological limitations, there is no causal relationship proving that celebrity worship diminishes cognitive abilities.

Though low levels of celebrity worship (entertainment-social) are not associated with any clinical measures, medium levels of celebrity worship (intense-personal) are related to fantasy proneness (approximately 10% of the shared variance), while high levels of celebrity worship (borderline-pathological) share a greater association with fantasy proneness (around 14% of the shared variance) and dissociation (around 3% of the shared variance, though the effect size of this is small and most probably due to the large sample size). This finding suggests that as "celebrity worship becomes more intense, and the individual perceives having a relationship with the celebrity, the more the individual is prone to fantasies."

Celebrity worship syndrome can lead to the manifestation of unhealthy tendencies such as materialism and compulsive buying, which can be supported by a study carried out by Robert. A. Reeves, Gary. A. Baker and Chris. S. Truluck. The results of this study link high rates of celebrity worship to high rates of materialism and compulsive buying.

A number of historical, ethnographic, netnographic and auto-ethnographic studies in diverse academic disciplines such as film studies, media studies, cultural studies and consumer research, which – unlike McCutcheon et al. focused mainly on a student sample (with two exceptions) – have actually studied real fans in the field, have come to very different conclusions that are more in line with Horton & Wohl's original concept of parasocial interaction or an earlier study by Leets.

== See also ==
- Anti-fan
- Cult of personality
- Fanaticism
- Fictosexuality
- Idolization
- Nijikon
- Obsessive love
- Oshikatsu
- Paparazzi
- Parasocial interaction
- Sasaeng fan
- Stalking
- Stan (fan)
- Yandere
- Cyberstalking
