= Sasaeng fan =

Obsessive fan of Korean idols

Sasaeng or sasaeng fan (Korean: 사생팬; Hanja: 私生팬; RR: sasaengpaen) is the South Korean term for an obsessive fan who invades the privacy of Korean idols, drama actors, or other public figures in the entertainment industry. One of the most notable activities associated with sasaeng fans is stalking. The term sasaeng comes from the Korean words sa (사; 私) meaning "private" and saeng (생; 生) meaning "life", in reference to the fans' intrusion into celebrities' private lives.

According to the estimates of celebrity managers in the Korean media, popular Korean celebrities may have "between 500 and 1,000 sasaeng fans", and be actively followed by about 100 sasaeng fans every day. Sasaeng fans are often female, aged 18 to 31, and may be driven to commit borderline criminal acts in order to gain attention from celebrities. Examples of such acts include seeking out celebrities at their dorms or homes, spreading rumours, stealing their personal belongings or information, harassing family members, and sending idols gifts such as lingerie.

== Background ==
Although the term sasaeng was coined much later, the obsessive, disruptive fan behavior it designates emerged with the rise of K-pop idol groups and "fandoms" in the 1990s, as noted by local English-language newspaper Korea JoongAng Daily in 2001. There are accounts of such fan behavior prior to the digital era from industry veterans and members of first generation K-pop groups such as H.O.T. and g.o.d. With the rapid development of the Korean popular culture industry, and the spread of the Hallyu wave internationally in the 2000s and in recent decades, extreme and disruptive fan behavior towards Korean idols and celebrities has also been seen abroad.

== Motives ==
Many sasaengs are motivated by a desire to gain recognition from their idols and stand out from other fans. One sasaeng fan interviewed gave an explanation for this obsessive behavior:

I feel like I get to know more about and get closer to the idol I love. If I go to a concert, there are thousands of people attending, so the idol would not know who I am. But if I become sasaeng, they will recognize me. If I keep telling them, 'I am so-and-so. I saw you at that place before. I am so-and-so', they will start to take note of me and ask 'Did you come again today?' To sasaeng fans, being recognized by idols is a good thing.

This need for individual recognition from idols has fueled some notable sasaeng acts. Physical assault is one perceived way of being remembered. In 2012, a sasaeng reportedly slapped Yoochun, of the boy group JYJ, in the face, justifying herself by saying that the idol would surely remember her from then on.

While sasaengs have formed a network to help spread and share information, sasaeng activity is also individualistic. This includes disguising themselves as stage hands or managers to approach the star, or pretending to be reporters in order to gain entry to a press conference. The sasaeng who can get closest to an idol, or who can acquire private information no one else has, gains greater respect among other sasaengs.

=== Sasaengs vs. anti-fans ===
Anti-fans contrast with sasaeng fans in that their main goal is to see the ultimate failure of certain idols or groups. In 2006, TVXQ member Yunho was taken to hospital after accepting a drink laced with glue from an apparent fan. The suspect in this case had also given Yunho a letter criticizing TVXQ and seemingly threatening the band as a whole, and confessed to being an anti-fan of TVXQ. While both groups have been seen engaging in activities causing harm to idols and groups, sasaengs are motivated by the idea of recognition from idols, rather than a desire to ridicule and prevent the success of their target.

== Tactics ==
Sasaengs have developed various methods for obtaining information about idols, and have formed sasaeng networks to share information and form groups to accomplish tasks. It has been noted that sasaeng fans old enough to work will try to get jobs in industries bringing them closer either to their idols or to information concerning them. Target employers may include airline companies, phone companies, and credit card companies. In 2017, Brave Entertainment, home of solo artist Samuel, dismissed two staff members for sasaeng fan activity that included following other artists and communicating personal information about Samuel.

The increased popularity of social media has made possible the sale of information concerning idols on social media platforms such as Twitter, KakaoTalk, and Instagram. Some sasaengs have access to wide-ranging personal information, that may include home addresses, cellphone numbers, flight details, personal social media accounts, credit card account numbers, audio recordings, and videos. Some sellers also offer to sell the methods they use to obtain this information. One seller of such information tweeted:

I have pretty much any idol's information. EXO, BTS, NCT, Wanna One, Produce 101, etc. Audio recordings, Kakao Talk, phone numbers, passports, Twitter [accounts], dormitories, private Instagram accounts, and videos. Send me a DM [direct message].

The so-called "sasaeng taxi" is a method used by sasaengs to follow idols to their scheduled activities or personal appointments. Such taxis charge an average of $600 a day, and will follow an idol or group for the entire day, exceeding speed limits and breaking other traffic rules. Drivers of such taxis may wait outside venues for customers.

Such methods, costly in terms of both time and money, have resulted in sasaeng fans missing or dropping out of school, sleeping in Internet cafes, or turning to prostitution to cover their sasaeng-related expenses.

In 2014, a 21-year-old woman was arrested for selling fraudulent merchandise of the band EXO. Most buyers never received their products, or later found that the woman had sold on to them products that she had rented. She admitted that the approximately 4.7 million won (c. $4,583) she had accumulated was intended to cover the cost of closely following EXO.

== In the media ==
The media understands sasaeng fans to be people who begin as "normal" fans but go on to devote their personal and social lives to the quest to stand out or become closer to an idol or celebrity. The portrayal of sasaeng behavior in the media often attaches fear and stigma to selectively represented actions identified as problematic, including missing school and sleeping in internet cafes to meet with idols.

Typical media reports of sasaeng fan behavior focus on an instance, or instances, of socially disruptive fan activity, and include criticism from sources including "average" fans, industry representatives, and other figures whose social standing lends moral weight to the negative coverage. Fans of K-pop are often quick to draw distinctions between "normal" fandom and behavior said to characterize a sasaeng fan. Sasaeng fan identity and personality is often represented in mass and social media using terms that carry negative connotations and express extremes, such as "crazed", "obsessive", "maniac", "abnormal", "unlikable", "antisocial", "psychotic", "unstable", "delusional", "sociopathic", "deranged", "hostile", and "disturbing".

== Examples of incidents ==
=== TVXQ and JYJ ===
K-pop boy bands TVXQ and JYJ have been particular targets of sasaeng attention, with reports of sasaeng fans tapping TVXQ band members' phones, breaking into the band's apartment, and poisoning member Yunho, who had to have his stomach pumped as a result. Sasaeng fans also installed cameras in JYJ member Yoochun's private parking lot. In 2012, audio of Yoochun and bandmate Jaejoong reportedly shouting at and hitting female fans was uploaded to an online message board. JYJ band members addressed this incident at a press conference. Yoochun said that sasaeng fans had been following the group for eight years, since they were members of TVXQ, and that the constant surveillance "felt like prison". Band member Junsu said that sasaeng fans had tapped his private phone calls, installed GPS trackers on the band's cars, and broken into their private property. Jaejoong issued an apology for lashing out at fans. A video of TVXQ member Changmin dragging and throwing a sasaeng from his cab was uploaded in 2018.

=== Car accidents ===
There have been a number of car accidents involving Korean idols being followed by sasaeng fans. In 2011, two members of the band Super Junior were caught in a six-car collision after being chased by eight fan vehicles in Singapore. The band members, Leeteuk and Heechul, were unharmed, but Heechul later tweeted that he still suffered after-effects from the accident and was often afraid to drive. In 2013, Seungri, formerly of the band BigBang, suffered minor injuries in a car accident in Shanghai involving a sasaeng fan. In 2015, Chanyeol of the band Exo wrote on Weibo that he was constantly followed by 20 fan vehicles during a visit to Shanghai. In 2016, Jackson of Got7 sustained minor injuries in an accident on the way to an airport in China that involved a fan closely following his car.

=== Home intrusion ===
Idols including Jung Yong-hwa of CNBLUE, Zico of Block B, Junho of 2PM, and Lay of Exo have reported incidents of sasaeng fans following them home or attempting to break in to their homes. In 2014, a fan unlawfully entered singer Seo Taiji's home, and was found sitting in the singer's car when police arrived. Seo did not press charges against the fan, who admitted to having "lurked" near the singer's home on other occasions.

=== Blood writing ===
In November 2009, a fan of boy group 2PM member Ok Taecyeon posted writing in blood, later reported to be menstrual blood, as proof of her adulation. This obsessive behavior toward the celebrity led to criticism of her actions, including from other 2PM fans.

In December 2009, an obsessive fan of MBLAQ's Lee Joon (real name Lee Chang-sun) wrote and posted a message written in blood on social media. The message read, "Don't forget me, Lee Chang-sun. I only have you. I love you". She cited the 2PM blood-writing incident as impetus and motive for her act, writing in her caption, "What was that Ok Taecyeon fan's blood writing. Period blood is so gross. I'll show what blood writing is."

In January 2010, an obsessive fan of the group Wonder Girls cut her wrist and used her own blood to write, "Come back, Wonder Girls". She posted the picture of her face half-covered by her hand, showing the blood-writing and the scar on her wrist.

== Responses from idols and companies ==
Entertainment companies, idol groups, and individual idols have responded to sasaeng activity on social media or in interviews. Soompi, a Korean pop culture news website, has documented many of these cases.

=== Individual idols ===
In a July 2018 interview, Brian, a member of the R&B duo Fly to the Sky, stated that packages had been delivered to his personal address and that he was worried not only for himself but for his family, who were also being harassed. He said, "I want to know what this person's reason is for leaving comments this bad, and I want them to stop." Other individual responses include Got7's Mark and Youngjae, Exo's Lay, and Ailee, all of whom have reproached sasaeng fans for following idols back to their residences, flooding idols' phones with calls and texts, taking unwanted videos and pictures of idols, and following idols as they met their schedules.

In April 2016, Girls' Generation band member Taeyeon complained of receiving constant calls from strangers. She posted screenshots showing missed calls from strangers on Instagram, saying "Just let me sleep", and "This is not helping at all for both of us".

In April 2016, Shinee member Key posted a photo on Instagram of a KakaoTalk group chat of full of foreign fans. He stated that he had been struggling as a result of the number of chat room invitations and missed calls from sasaeng fans, and is quoted as addressing them to say, "You can't call yourself a fan", and "It is really insulting and unbearable".

=== Idol groups ===
In 2013, the members of band Exo collectively expressed their frustration and disappointment, noting the unfair treatment suffered by "normal" fans often mistaken for sasaengs. Member Suho called on sasaengs to stop such behavior if they truly cared about the group.

=== Entertainment companies ===
Entertainment companies have also addressed the issue of sasaeng fans and their activities. Swing Entertainment, home of the group Wanna One, accused sasaeng fans of causing band members stress on tour in 2018. Girl group DreamCatcher's agency, Happy Face Entertainment, told sasaengs who had been waiting for members at their scheduled appointments and secretly taking photos and videos to stop such behavior. The agency stated that these actions had breached band members' privacy.

=== Effects on idols ===
The actions of sasaeng fans can have a psychological impact on some idols. D.O., a member of the band Exo, said in an interview that he had developed a "victim mentality" due to sasaengs, and that it had severely affected his public appearances and activities. In 2016, Heechul of Super Junior described feelings of paranoia, and the trauma that the actions of certain sasaeng fans had caused him. On the show Handsome Boys of the 20th Century, first-generation idol singers Eun Ji-won of Sechs Kies and Moon Hee-joon of the band H.O.T also admitted to paranoid feelings whenever they left their homes. Eun stated that he developed an addiction to video games, as he would stay at home out of fear of being accosted by crowds of fans.

== Legal response ==
Many countries have laws curtailing behavior characteristic of sasaeng fans. In the United States, the state of California adopted the country's first anti-stalking law in 1990. Laws differ from state to state, but all states have laws against stalking. In Germany, section 238 of the Criminal Code has imposed criminal sanctions on stalking since 2007, and legal protection was strengthened with the entry into force of the Act to Improve Protection Against Stalking in 2017. Japan has a number of laws covering different aspects of celebrity stalking. For example, waiting in front of house/office, following, wiretapping, and repeated relationship demands carry a penalty of 1 year of imprisonment or a fine of one million yen. Japan has also passed laws against continuous messaging, including on social media.

==== South Korea ====
Although sasaeng fan activity has caused K-pop celebrities difficulties since the 1990s, for many years Korea had no special laws to prevent or to penalize celebrity stalking. A sasaeng fan incident involving the band Sanulrim's lead vocalist, Kim Changwan, moved the government to act. Kim Changwan was stalked by one of his fans for over 10 years, and he eventually accused the fan of stalking. After serving a jail term of 1 year, the fan resumed following the singer, ultimately assaulting him and breaking his nose. The law was amended to include an offense of "Persistent harassment", or stalking, in 2011.

This clause, added to South Korea's Minor Offenses Act in February 2011, was aimed at protecting idols from overzealous fans. That same year, the South Korean government's Korea Creative Content Agency reportedly founded a support center for celebrities to offer counseling services "to relieve [celebrities] of any psychological stress."

The Minor Offences Act was revised in March 2013 to impose a fine of KRW 80,000 (about US$72 at the time) for a conviction of stalking. Increased concerns, and a rising number of stalking victims, led to introduction of a new South Korean bill in February 2016 to increase the maximum penalty for stalking to KRW 20 million (about US$17,000 at the time) and two years in jail.

On February 22, 2018, a national coordination meeting was held. At this meeting, the government announced plans to finalize details of stalking and dating violence prevention measures and penalties in the first half of that year, and clarify the definition of the offense of stalking and its types. It said that penalties for stalking would become more severe, with higher fines and prison sentences applying. These measures were to apply in celebrity stalking cases, recognizing that Korean celebrities suffer from many forms of abuse, both physical and mental, as a result of the actions of sasaeng fans.

As of November 2018, the new measures had not yet become law, and did not yet appear on the government website listing all Korean laws.

== In popular culture ==
The television series Reply 1997, portraying events in Korean popular culture of the 1990s, recounts the rise of fan obsession with celebrities. As opportunities for fans to interact with celebrities were limited, people opted to become "Sukso fans", or sasaeng fans who stay outside a celebrity's house all night until they get to see their idol. These fans had self-imposed rules against trespassing on the house, forcing the celebrity to come out, or taking pictures of the celebrity.

== See also ==
- Anti-fan
- Celebrity worship syndrome
- Cyberstalking
- Idolization
- Fandom culture in South Korea
- Korean idol
- Stalking
- Stan (fan)
