= Anti-fan =

Person displaying hatred towards something

A hater, anti-fan, toxic fan, detractor or anti is someone who enjoys writing, discussing, or (in some cases) making derivative works about a piece of media, but solely for the purpose of rallying against or parodying it. It can also be a person with hatred towards a celebrity or icon. Haters often attract other haters to create a negative community. They are at odds with the fans. Someone who opposes a ship (a romantic pairing between two characters) is called an anti-shipper.

== Behaviours ==
Anti-fandoms appear in many forms from hate-watching to snark.

It is common for large anti-fandoms to gather in groups, usually on forums and sites, to share their mutual aversion. These are coined anti-fan clubs and some are substantial enough to become anti-fan sites.

== Criteria ==
There is a saying that "haters attract haters", which suggests that individuals who express negativity or hostility may draw similar reactions from others. This idea is rooted in the concept of reciprocity, where negative energy or behavior can be mirrored and reciprocated by those who encounter it. These haters are often found in negative communities and thrive off of their own negativity.

== Examples ==
In 2006, an anti-fan of the K-pop duo TVXQ poisoned member Yunho with a super glue-laced drink. Instead of pressing charges against the anti-fan, he chose to forgive her, since the girl was the same age as his younger sister. Such occurrences have resulted in an increase of security for celebrities in South Korea. I Hate Christian Laettner is a sports documentary film looking into hatred towards Christian Laettner.

== In popular culture ==
Both the film and TV version of So I Married an Anti-fan were based on the novel of the same name.

== Studies ==
Anti-fan studies include a focus on specific communities of practice and their relationship to the media texts and fans actively marginalizing or discrediting other fans solely on basis of identity (sex, race, etc.).

== See also ==
- Anti-Barney humor
- Anti-bronies
- Anti-social behaviour
- Cancel culture
- Cringe culture
- Cyberbullying
- Fanaticism
- Get Off My Internets
- Ghosting
- Idolization
- Internet troll
- Online shaming
- Sasaeng fan
- Stalking
- Stan (fan)
- Snark subreddits
