= Impact and popularity of K-pop =

While the industry of K-pop originates in South Korea, with the rise of the Korean Wave, the demand for Korean pop music has spread globally. As the genre expanded globally, so did the fan culture. This has led to the globalization of Korean pop music. Key aspects of K-pop fan culture include learning choreography, purchasing albums and other merchandise, and engaging with other fans on social media platforms. Many fans even travel internationally to attend concerts or visit South Korea itself, reflecting how K-pop inspires a level of engagement that blends entertainment, community, and lifestyle. K-pop music has taken the world by storm creating a massive fan base in all regions of the world.

== Fan culture ==
Many fans travel overseas to see their idols on tour, and tourists commonly visit South Korea from Japan and China to see K-pop concerts. A K-pop tour group from Japan had more than 7,000 fans fly to Seoul to meet boy band JYJ in 2012, and during JYJ's concert in Barcelona in 2011, fans from many parts of the world camped overnight to gain entrance. A 2011 survey conducted by the Korean Culture and Information Service reported that there were over three million active members of hallyu fan clubs.

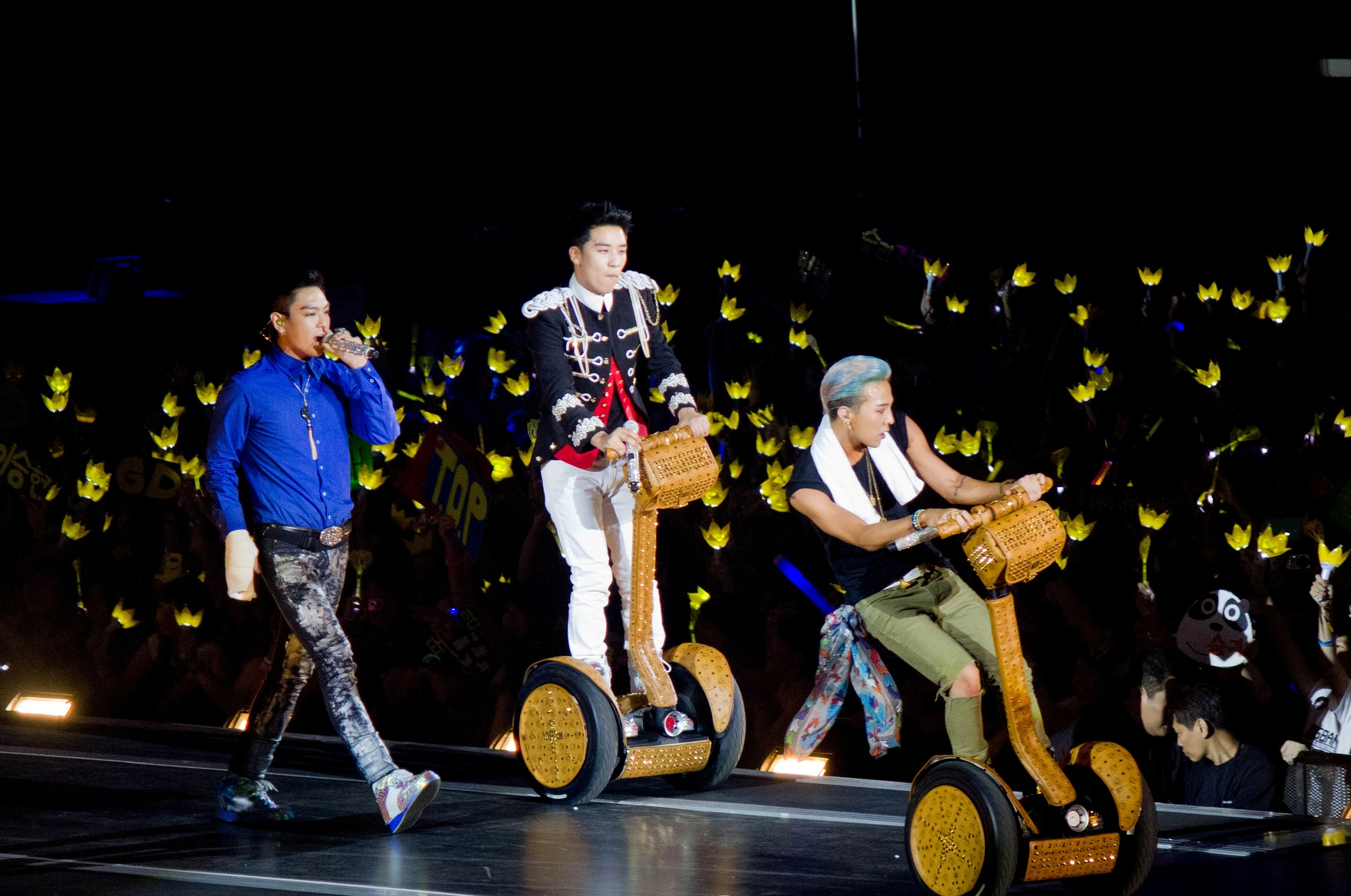
BigBang fans (VIPs) hold crown shaped light sticks during a concert: this is the symbol of the fan club.

Bang Si-hyuk, the music industry executive behind BTS, expressed that K-pop idol fans view their idol differently from how music fans view a typical singer. Idol fans want to feel close to and be a part of their idol's lifestyle, even outside of live performances.

An article by The Wall Street Journal indicated that K-pop's future staying power will be shaped by fans, whose online activities have evolved into "micro-businesses." K-pop groups commonly have dedicated fan clubs with a collective name and sometimes an assigned colour, to which they will release merchandise. For example, TVXQ fans are known as 'Cassiopeia,' and their official colour is 'pearl red.' Some of the more popular groups have personalized light sticks for use at concerts; for example, BigBang fans hold yellow crown-shaped light sticks.

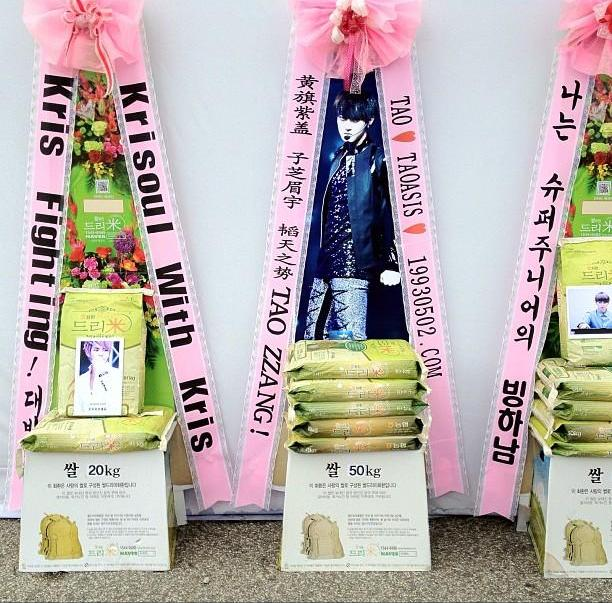
Fan rice for the South Korean boyband Exo

Fan clubs sometimes participate in charity events to support their idols, purchasing bags of 'fan rice' in order to show support. The rice bags are donated to those in need. According to Time, for one of BigBang's shows, 12.7 tons of rice were donated from 50 fan clubs around the world. There are businesses in South Korea dedicated to shipping rice from farmers to the venues. Another way that fan clubs show their devotion is by sending lunch to idols during their schedules, and there are catering companies in South Korea specifically for this purpose. Increasingly, fans participate in activism that extends outside of the K-pop community.

A unique feature of K-pop fandom is the "fan chant". When an idol group releases a new song, chants, usually consisting of group members' names, are performed by live concert audiences during non-singing parts of songs.

=== Obsession ===
Some idols and idol groups have faced problems from obsessive fans who indulge in stalking or invasive behavior. These fans are known as sasaeng fans (사생팬; 私生팬; sasaengpaen), from the Korean word for 'private life,' which alludes to their penchant for invading the privacy of idols and members of idol groups. There have been accounts of extreme behaviors from fans trying to gain idols' attention. South Korean public officials recognize this as a unique but serious concern.

Some idols have responded towards sasaeng fans, for which some have received backlash; including members of JYJ, Kim Heechul, and Kim Jaejoong.

In response to the issue, a law introduced in February 2016 in South Korea saw the penalty for stalking rise to around US$17,000 as well as a possible two-year jail sentence.

=== Social media ===
Social media sites such as YouTube, Twitter, and Facebook allow K-pop artists to reach a global audience and to communicate readily with their fans. K-pop fandoms are also active on Instagram, TikTok, Reddit, Tumblr and Twitch. As global online music market revenue approximately doubled from 2014 to 2024 with digital transformation, music consumers around the world are more likely to be exposed to K-pop.

=== YouTube ===
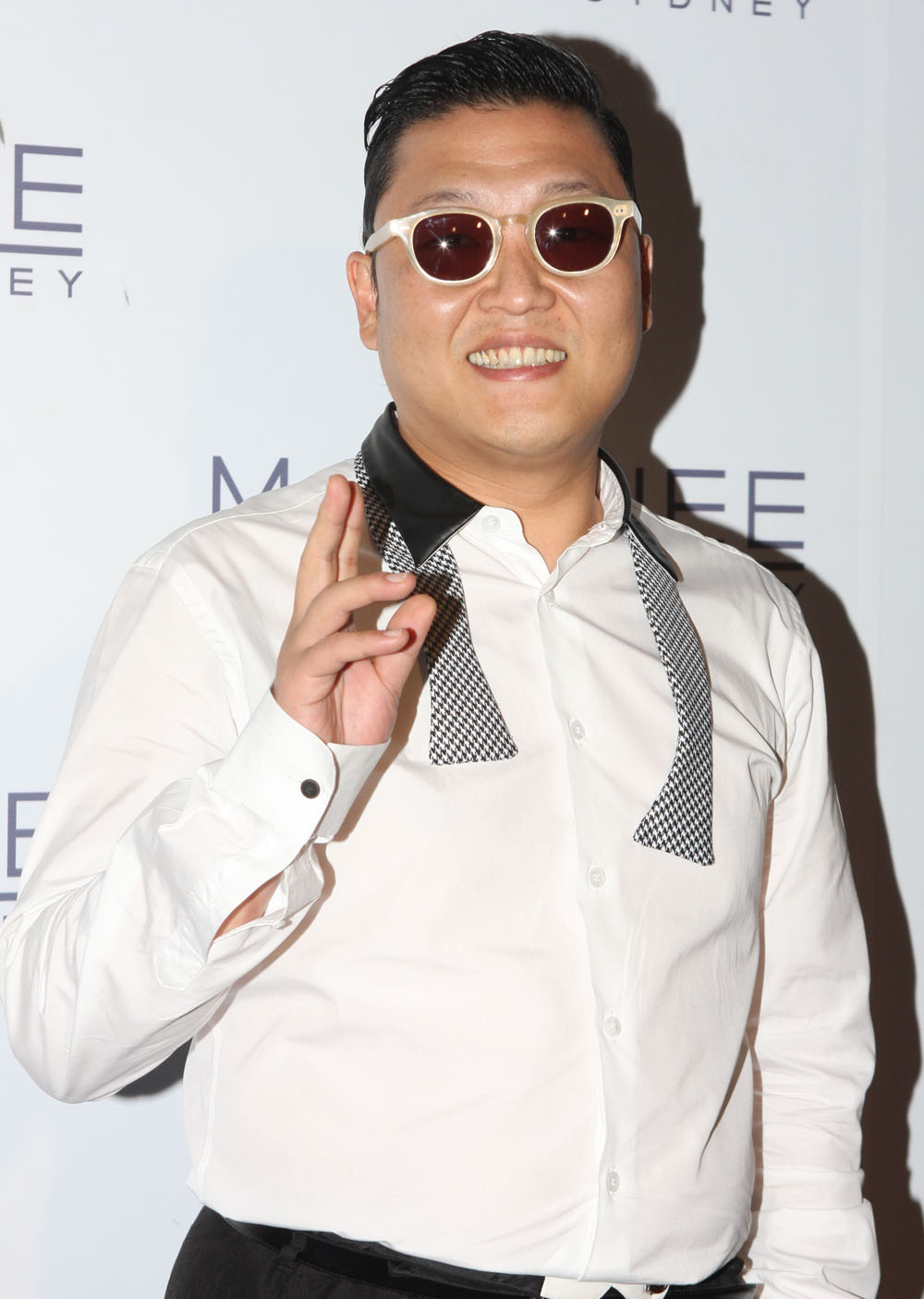
Psy, whose music video for "Gangnam Style" in December 2012 became the first to reach more than a billion YouTube views

Since K-pop started to spread its industry outside South Korea, K-pop artists have set notable records on YouTube. In December 2011, K-pop became the first country-specific genre of music to gain a homepage on YouTube. In December 2012, Psy's music video for "Gangnam Style" became the first YouTube video to receive 1 billion views. On 11 November 2019, girl group Blackpink's music video for "Ddu-Du-Ddu-Du" became the first music video by a K-pop group to reach 1 billion views on the platform. On May 21, 2021, BTS' music video for "Butter" set a record for the most viewed online music video in the first 24 hours, garnering over 108 million views. As of August 2024, "Butter" still holds this record. Youtube shorts also become a trend for K-pop group to advertise and sharing contents to build closer bonds with fans.

=== X (formerly Twitter) ===
X (formerly Twitter) has also been a significant social media platform for K-pop stars to get connections and promotions. The viral song "Gangnam Style" gained popularity from mentions by prominent Twitter users. Bang Si Hyuk, the producer of BTS, partially attributed the fast growth of their fanbase to social media such as Twitter. On November 13, 2017, BTS became the first South Korean act to reach 10 million followers on Twitter. From 2017 to 2021 Billboard Music Awards, BTS won the award for Top Social Media Artist based on Twitter voting by their fans. According to YeonJeong Kim, the Head of Global Kpop & K-Content Partnerships, over 7.8 billion #KpopTwitter were posted worldwide in 2021, marking a 16% increase from 2020. Fan engagement with K-pop on Twitter remains strong, with multiple idol groups, including BTS, BLACKPINK, and Stray Kids, exceeding 10 million followers.

=== TikTok ===
Multiple entertainment companies use TikTok to market and promote their artists' music. The "Any Song" dance challenge by rapper Zico garnered 400 million views in less than two months, with around 830,000 videos uploaded featuring the sound. Fifty Fifty's song "Cupid" went viral on TikTok with over 400,000 videos published with the sound. Prior to the TikTok audio, Fifty Fifty were averaging 300,000 monthly listeners on Spotify to over a million.

== East Asia ==
=== Japan ===
Following the lifting of WWII-era restrictions imposed on exchanges and trade between South Korea and Japan in the late 1990s, the first-generation girl group S.E.S became the first South Korean artists to debut in Japan in late 1998, releasing their first Japanese-language album Reach Out in 1999. Young K-pop star BoA had Japanese-language training before her South Korean debut and when she debuted in Japan in 2002 with her first Japanese-language album Listen to My Heart, her South Korean identity was inessential, as her music style and fluency in Japanese led her to be considered a part of J-pop. Listen to My Heart was the first album by a South Korean singer to debut atop the Japanese Oricon Charts and become an RIAJ-certified "million-seller" in Japan. BoA has since released several Japanese albums, most of which have topped the Oricon Charts.

Following BoA's successful Japanese debut, TVXQ debuted in Japan in 2005 under a procedure similar to BoA's. TVXQ did not promote their South Korean identity, and their ballad-style songs fit well into J-pop's typical sound. TVXQ's first and second albums released in Japan were minor successes, peaking on the Oricon Charts at twenty-five and ten respectively. However, on January 16, 2008, TVXQ reached the top of the Oricon Charts with their sixteenth Japanese single "Purple Line", becoming the first South Korean male group to have a number-one single in Japan. They have since had remarkable success with their comebacks. In 2018, they accumulated over 1.2 million people to their concerts, beating Japanese band B'z. Since the start of the Korean Wave, the Japanese market has seen an influx of South Korean pop acts such as Kara, Girls' Generation, 2PM, SS501, Shinee, Super Junior, and BigBang. In 2011, it was reported that the total sales for K-pop artists' increased 22.3% between 2010 and 2011 in Japan. Some Korean artists were in the top 10 selling artists of the year in Japan.

As of 2019, several other K-pop groups have debuted in the Japanese market including Exo, BTS, Got7, Seventeen, iKon, GFriend, Astro, Pentagon, Twice, Monsta X, FT Island, NCT 127 and Blackpink. Many of these groups debut with Japanese versions of their recent Korean releases, then later release original Japanese songs. Many groups such as Twice, NCT 127, and Pentagon also include Japanese members that auditioned in Japan and were brought to South Korea, or came to South Korea in order to become a K-pop singer.

With tensions still remaining between South Korea and Japan, the import of South Korean popular culture has been met with different forms of resistance, in the form of the 'Anti-Korean Wave.' One demonstration against the Korean Wave with roughly 500 participants was broadcast on Japan's Fuji TV to an Internet audience of over 120,000. However, the chairman of the Presidential Council on National Branding cited this resistance as proof of "how successful Korean Wave is." Some argue that this was not a protest against the Korean Wave itself, but rather a broader expression of anti-Korean sentiment targeting the people and nation, rather than its popular culture. In fact, many young Japanese fans have been observed consciously separating their political views from their enjoyment of K-pop, choosing to appreciate the music and entertainment while distancing themselves from anti-Korean political discourse. The Korean Wave has also interested Japanese people to pursue a pop music career by going to South Korea to become K-pop stars.

=== China ===
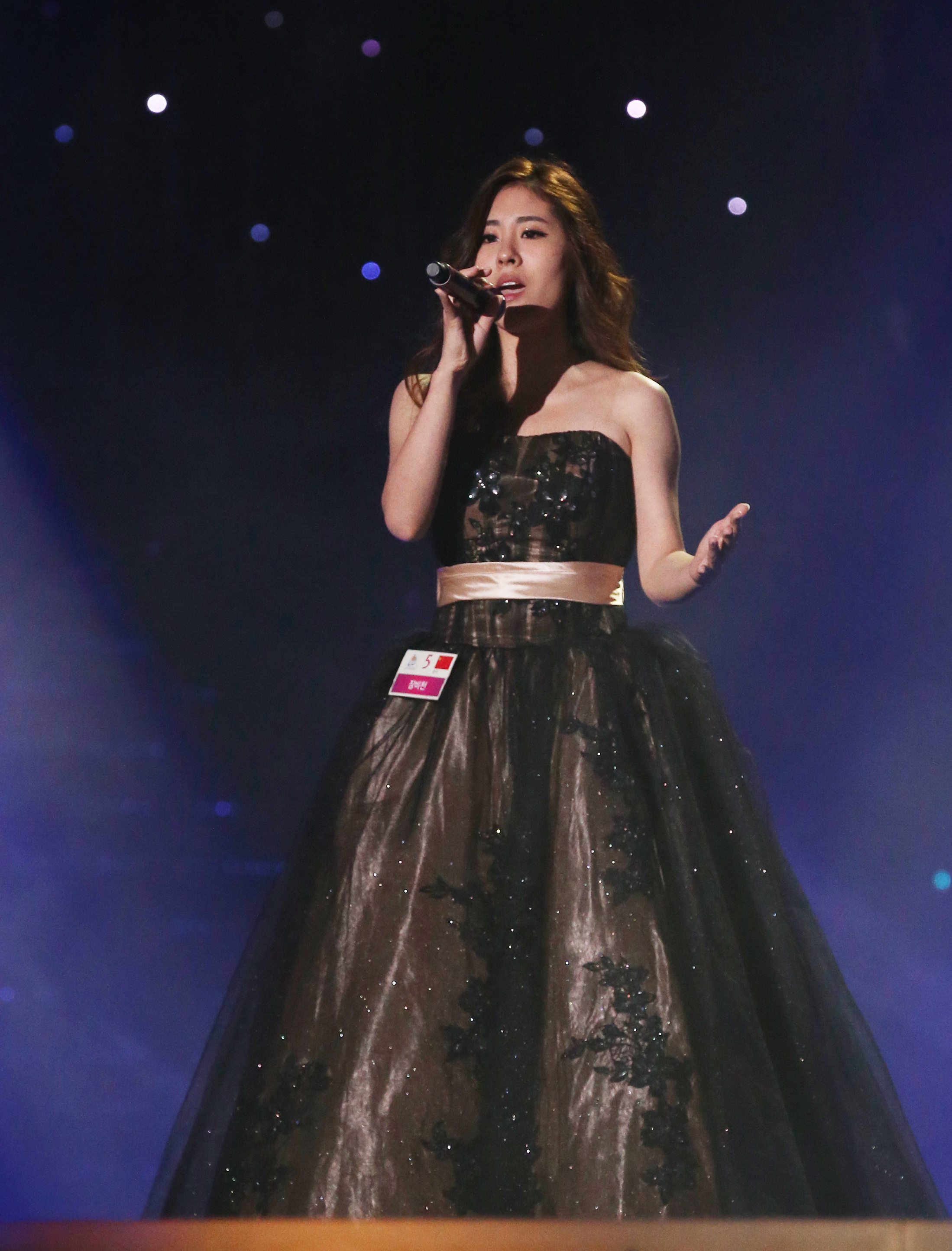
Chinese singer Zhang Bichen, later a member of K-pop girl group Sunny Days, performs during 2012's K-POP World Festival.

The 1990s saw the rise of K-pop in China through groups like H.O.T., S.E.S., Baby Vox, Shinhwa, and Sechs Kies—sparking China's investment in South Korea's entertainment industry. K-pop artists have achieved considerable success in China since then: in 2005, Rain held a concert in Beijing with 40,000 attendees. In 2010, the Wonder Girls won an award for the highest digital sales for a foreign artist, with 5 million digital downloads, in the 5th annual China Mobile Wireless Music Awards.

More recently, China has become the South Korean entertainment industry's biggest market for exports. Twelve percent of SM Entertainment's sales in 2015 went to China, and this number rose to 14.4 percent by the middle of 2016. China has found that K-pop is a profitable investment. According to Director of Communication for the Korea Economic Institute of America Jenna Gibson, sales for a certain shampoo brand rose by 630% after Super Junior endorsed it on a Chinese reality show. K-pop's popularity has also led China's e-commerce company Alibaba to buy roughly $30 million worth of SM Entertainment's shares in 2016 in order to help its expansion into the online music industry. Legend Capital China has also invested in BTS' label BigHit Entertainment. As of the beginning of 2017, China took up around 8–20 percent of major South Korean entertainment companies' total sales. Chinese entertainment companies have also claimed stakes in the industry, partially overseeing groups like EXID and T-ara or representing groups which include both Chinese and South Korean members like Uniq and WJSN.

Having Chinese members in K-pop groups is one way that South Korean entertainment companies increase K-pop's marketability and appeal in China. Han Geng, who debuted in 2005 as a member of the group Super Junior, is widely considered the first Chinese K-pop idol, and the group miss A is another early notable example, being composed of two South Korean nationals and two Chinese nationals. Other strategies include giving South Korean members Chinese-sounding names, releasing songs or whole albums in Chinese, and making subgroups with members that predominantly speak Mandarin, such as SM Entertainment's Exo-M and Super Junior-M, which has had successful results on the Kuang Nan Record and CCR.

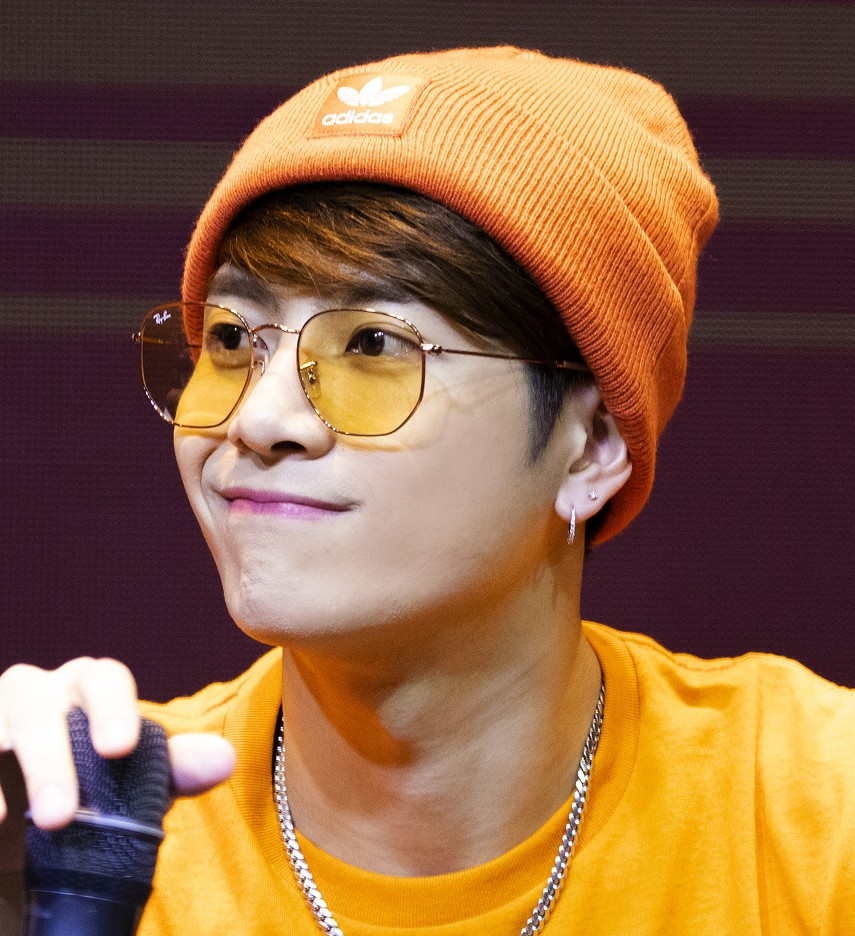
Hong Kong singer Jackson Wang from Got7 at a fansigning event in Yeouido

A number of Chinese K-pop idols, such as Super Junior-M's Han Geng, Exo-M's Kris, Luhan, and Tao, and f(x)'s Victoria Song have left their respective K-pop groups or labels in order to pursue solo careers in China. However, lately, South Korean entertainment companies have allowed their Chinese K-pop idols more freedom in pursuing solo work in China. Got7's Jackson Wang, for example, has released several of his own songs in China and, in 2017, reached number one on Chinese music charts.

The K-pop industry's methods of producing idols have influenced the practices of Chinese entertainment companies, which aim to reproduce K-pop idols' success with their own stars so that Chinese entertainers can compete better globally. To achieve this, those companies have recruited K-pop industry experts, and some of these insiders have actively started moving into the Chinese music industry to capitalize on K-pop's increasing influence on market demands. Chinese reality show Idol Producer further highlights K-pop's impact on China's entertainment scene: closely mirroring South Korea's Produce 101.

Additionally, the rise of K-pop has led to an increase in the number of Chinese tourists in South Korea—3.8 million more Chinese toured South Korea in 2016 than 2015 according to the Union of International Associations.

=== North Korea ===
Despite North Korea's traditionally strict isolationism, K-pop has managed to reach a North Korean audience. While consumption of South Korean entertainment is punishable by death in North Korea, it has still become increasingly more available with the global rise of technology and the implementation of underground smuggling networks over the past decades. The methodology was initially the use of DVDs, however North Korean law enforcement had figured out how to catch people consuming the media from DVDs so few accessed them. Technology advancements meant the adoption of flash drives, with access to USB drives and SD cards rising from 26% to 81% in from 2010 to 2014, with a large majority containing South Korean music and dramas. The technology advancements lowered prices from upwards of US$50 to under $10, making them more affordable and easier to send. Some South Korean humanitarians have also deployed drones and balloons carrying these flash drives in order to make the media more accessible.

The earlier higher costs and risks meant that only wealthy families were able to consume the media, and because most youths lacked the resources, most earlier consumers of South Korean were the middle-aged elite who favored K-dramas over K-pop due to their more traditional behavior. A researcher at the Korea Institute for National Unification claims to have never met a single defector who had not seen or listened to foreign media before entering South Korea.

K-pop has been utilized as propaganda across the DMZ since the 1950s, being broadcast across the border alongside Korean and world news. In 2004, both countries agreed to end the broadcasts. After an incident in 2015, South Korea resumed broadcasting anti-North news for four days, and after North Korea tested its hydrogen bomb in 2016 has permanently restored broadcasting. In April 2018, in preparation for the meeting between Kim Jong Un and Moon Jae In, the South Korean speakers ceased their broadcasts. These loudspeakers can be heard up to six miles (10 km) into North Korean territory.

In 2018, Kim Jong Un stated he was "deeply moved" after attending a two-hour concert in Pyongyang featuring 150 South Korean performers including singer Cho Yong-pil and the girl group Red Velvet. This concert marked the first performance by South Korean artists attended by a North Korean leader. The concert, attended by 1500 North Korean elites, also displayed growing relations between the North and the South. None of the song line ups, lyrics, or dance moves of the performers were asked to be changed by traditionalist North Korean officials. The South Korean artists also performed alongside notable North Korean artists in the following week. Recordings of both performances have been made public to South Koreans, though no reports have been made of their release to the North Korean public. Despite previous events, Kim Jong Un has since referred to K-pop as a "vicious cancer" and a threat to North Korean society.

=== Taiwan ===
The Korean Wave and K-pop positively impacted perceptions of South Korea in Taiwan. Taiwanese people's favorable impression of South Korea continues to increase significantly, which also makes the relationship between South Korea and Taiwan very close. Notable Taiwanese nationals who have seen success in the K-pop industry include Twice's Tzuyu and I-dle's Shuhua.

== Southeast Asia ==
=== Thailand ===
The Korean wave in Thailand first began with the popularity of Korean dramas in the early 2000s, with dozens being broadcast on Thai television networks each year, which led to interest in other Korean cultural exports such as K-pop. The first K-pop group to debut in Thailand was Baby Vox in 2002. Following the debut of Thai-American Nichkhun of 2PM in 2008 and his subsequent popularity within both South Korea and Thailand, major South Korean agencies began organizing trainee auditions in Thailand. Since then, the K-pop industry has had several successful idols of Thai background, such as Blackpink's Lisa, GOT7's Bambam, NCT's Ten, and I-dle's Minnie. Various K-pop festivals and concerts have been held in Thailand, such as MBC's music program Show! Music Core hosting a Korean Music Wave special in Bangkok three times from 2011 to 2013, as well as KCON frequently being held in Thailand since 2018.

=== Singapore ===
There is a thriving K-pop fanbase in Singapore, where idol groups, such as 2NE1, BTS, Girls' Generation, Got7 and EXO, often hold concert tour dates. The popularity of K-pop alongside South Korean dramas has influenced the aesthetics image of Singaporeans. South Korean-style "straight eyebrows" have become quite popular among many Singaporean females and males of Chinese, Malay and Indian descent. Singaporean beauty salons have seen an increase in the number of customers interested in getting South Korean-style "straight eyebrows" and South Korean-style haircuts in recent years. On August 5, 2017, Singapore hosted the 10th Music Bank World Tour, a concert spin-off of Music Bank, a popular weekly music programme by South Korean broadcaster KBS. This event proved the immense popularity of the hallyu wave in Singapore.

In recent years, several notable entertainment companies (both big and small scale), like Attrakt and YG Entertainment, came to Singapore to conduct auditions to select eligible candidates to train in South Korea, and a K-pop international school is also set to be established in Singapore with the collaboration between Singapore Raffles Music College (SRMC) and the prestigious School of Performing Arts Seoul (Sopa). According to Singaporean national newspaper The Straits Times in February 2024, over 120 teenage girls (mostly Singaporeans) took part in Attrakt's first and only on-site audition at Kallang Place, which aimed to recruit possible candidates to join the agency's girl group Fifty Fifty.

=== Malaysia ===
In Malaysia, among the three main ethnic groups—Malay, Chinese and Indian—many prefer to listen to music in their own languages, but K-pop and South Korean movies and TV series have become popular among all three ethnic groups, which Malaysian firms have capitalized upon. The popularity of K-pop has also resulted in politicians bringing K-pop idols to the country in order to attract young voters. Malaysians have accepted the Korean Wave more rapidly and even more favorably, notably in the 2010s, despite the fact that it came to Malaysia later and that the first reaction there was relatively hostile compared to other nations. Approximately 80% of Malaysian respondents have begun learning the Korean language due to their keen interest in Korean culture. Malaysia is also seventh in the world for the quantity of travelers visiting South Korea.

=== Indonesia ===
K-pop along with South Korean TV series and movies has turned into popular culture, especially among the young generation of Indonesia. This trend can be observed in any major city in the country. K-pop has also influenced music in Indonesia. Popularity of Korean culture has increased continuously in Indonesia since the early 2000s, starting with the East Asian popular culture boom.

=== Philippines ===
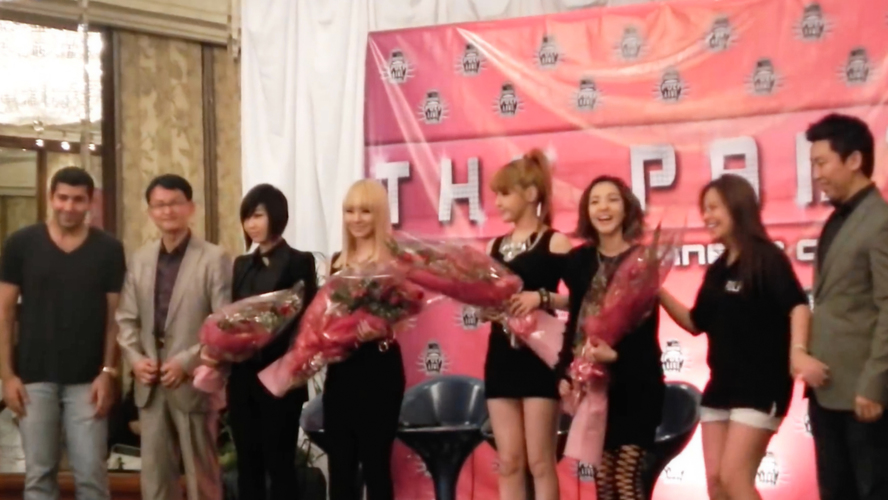
2NE1 at a press conference in Manila

South Korean telenovelas were aired locally in the Philippines starting in 2003, marking a further expansion of the Hallyu wave. K-pop took longer to catch on; it gained popularity through the internet, and through South Korean expatriate celebrities like Sandara Park. Super Junior held a concert in the Philippines in 2010.

=== Vietnam ===
Vietnam already had numerous contacts with South Korea in the past and even shared a similar political situation, notably the separation in half of both nations. Despite the tragedies of the Vietnam War, the country presently remains welcoming of the South Korean influence on the Vietnamese population. Vietnamese pop music, known as V-pop, is heavily influenced by K-pop in terms of music production and music videos.

In 2015, the northern capital city of Hanoi hosted the Music Bank World Tour. In the year of 2018, V Live and RBW Entertainment Vietnam launched special monthly mini-concerts called "V Heartbeat Live", inviting both V-pop and K-pop stars to perform, such as Winner, Momoland, IKon, Sunmi, and more. In the same year, Park Ji-yeon collaborated with a Vietnamese singer, Soobin Hoàng Sơn, releasing Vietnamese and Korean versions of the single "Between Us." K-pop, and Korean culture in general, gained popularity mainly because of the Vietnamese youth.

South Korean entertainment companies are investing and searching for talent in Vietnam. For example, SM Entertainment announced plans for a Vietnamese sub-unit of the South Korean boy group NCT, which executive producer Lee Soo-man called "NCT-V", to promote V-pop globally. Lee also said that Vietnamese culture is extremely similar to Korean culture, which is favorable for both countries in terms of global expansion. In 2018, SM Entertainment hosted their annual Global Audition in Hanoi and Ho Chi Minh City for the first time ever. Cube Entertainment held an audition session in 2018. On January 11–13 in 2019, Big Hit Entertainment established a joint venture with entertainment company CJ E&M to host an audition called the "2019 Belift Global Audition."

== South Asia ==
=== Bangladesh ===
Bangladeshi youths, especially teens, have shown great attraction to South Korean pop music as they described such songs make them feel better. Starting from 2015, Bangladesh began to participate in an annual event called K-Pop World Music Festival which started in 2011 by the Ministry of Foreign Affairs of the Republic of Korea in cooperation with The Korean Broadcasting System (KBS). The objective of the event is not only to bring the hallyu fans all over the world to South Korea but also to bring people from different countries together in the name of culture.

=== India ===
In the Northeast Indian state of Manipur, where separatists have banned Bollywood movies, consumers have turned to South Korean popular culture for their entertainment needs. The BBC's correspondent Sanjoy Majumder reported that South Korean entertainment products are mostly unlicensed copies smuggled in from neighbouring Burma, and are generally well received by the local population. This has led to the increasing use of Korean phrases in common parlance amongst the young people of Manipur.

In order to capitalize on the popularity of K-pop in Manipur, many hairdressing salons have offered "Korean-style" cuts based on the hairstyles of K-pop boy bands. This wave of South Korean popular culture is currently spreading from Manipur to the neighbouring state of Nagaland. K-pop is catching up in various other states of the country and K-pop festivals and competitions draw thousands of fans.

== Middle East ==
K-pop has become increasingly popular across the Middle East over recent years, particularly among younger fans. In July 2011, Israeli fans met South Korea's Ambassador to Israel, Ma Young-sam, and traveled to Paris for the SMTown Live '10 World Tour in Europe. According to Dr. Nissim Atmazgin, a professor of East Asian Studies at Hebrew University of Jerusalem, "Many young people look at K-pop as culture capital—something that makes them stand out from the crowd." As of 2012, there are over 5,000 K-pop fans in Israel and 3,000 in the Palestinian territories. Some dedicated Israeli and Palestinian fans see themselves as "cultural missionaries" and actively introduce K-pop to their friends and relatives, further spreading the Hallyu wave within their communities.

In 2012, the number of fans in Turkey surpassed 100,000, reaching 150,000 in 2013. ZE:A appeared for a fan meet-and-greet session in Dubai and a concert in Abu Dhabi. In Cairo, hundreds of fans went to the Maadi Library's stage theater to see the final round of the K-pop Korean Song Festival, organized by the South Korean Embassy. In January 2018, Exo was invited to Dubai, United Arab Emirates for the Dubai Fountain Show. In 2019, BTS was invited to perform at King Fahd International Stadium in Riyadh by Crown Prince Mohammed Bin Salman, becoming the first boy band to play a solo stadium concert in Saudi Arabia.

== Africa ==
South Korean pop music, popularly known as K-pop, has gained a significant foothold worldwide in recent years. While its influence has been influential in Asia, Europe, and North America, Africa has emerged as an important market for K-pop, with Nigeria and South Africa leading the way. The growing popularity of K-pop in these African nations reflects its broad appeal, cultural exchange, and the increasing global reach of South Korean entertainment.

A significant factor behind K-pop's popularity in Nigeria and South Africa is the global nature of the internet and the spread of social media. Platforms like TikTok, YouTube, and Instagram have made it easier for African fans to access and engage with K-pop content, creating viral trends and fan activities. Moreover, K-pop's appeal cuts across language barriers, as its music incorporates universal themes of love, self-empowerment, and friendship. K-pop idols are known for their strong interaction with their fans through social media, which builds loyalty and engagement even from distant countries.

Additionally, the rise of South Korean cultural diplomacy through organizations like the Korean Cultural Center in Nigeria has facilitated cultural exchanges between South Korea and Africa. For example, K-pop competitions and K-culture events are regularly organized in African countries, allowing fans to express their love for the genre and participate in Korean cultural experiences.

=== Nigeria ===
Nigeria, Africa's most populous country, has become a vibrant hub for K-pop. According to various reports, Nigeria is now among the top three markets for K-pop in Sub-Saharan Africa. This rise in popularity can be attributed to several factors, including the power of digital platforms, especially social media and music streaming services like Spotify. Nigerian K-pop fans are deeply engaged with these platforms, which allow them to access music, videos, and live streams directly from South Korea. For instance, Spotify's 2022 year-end review of its Wrapped data revealed that BTS, one of the biggest K-pop groups globally, was leading the charge in Nigeria's K-pop fandom. Another example is the release of EXO's 2017 Winter Album 'Universe', which charted #1 on iTunes in Nigeria, demonstrating the group's significant influence in the country.

In 2024 a Nigerian Kdrama movie titled Mr Sunshine was released. It was made by Kemz Mama (Kemi Ikuseedun) also known as Mummy Wa of the Mr Macaroni pair.

=== South Africa ===
South Africa is also witnessing a remarkable rise in K-pop's popularity. It has become one of the top markets for K-pop in Africa. According to Statista, factors like K-pop's unique style, catchy tunes, and high-quality production contribute to its growing fanbase in South Africa.

South African K-pop fans have also embraced Korean culture beyond just the music. This includes an interest in South Korean dramas (K-dramas), fashion, language, and cuisine. Hallyu, or Korean Wave, refers to South Korean culture's global popularity and has seen a distinct rise in South Africa as fans participate in South Korean-themed events, language classes, and fan meetups. A key driver of K-pop's growth in South Africa is the accessibility provided by platforms such as YouTube and Spotify, where K-pop content is readily available, along with efforts by South Korean cultural centres that organize events to promote K-pop and Korean culture.

=== Kenya ===
In 2022, Kenya saw a 140% increase in K-pop streams, second only to South Africa in the region, with BTS, Stray Kids and Blackpink being the most streamed K-pop artists.

== North America ==
=== United States ===
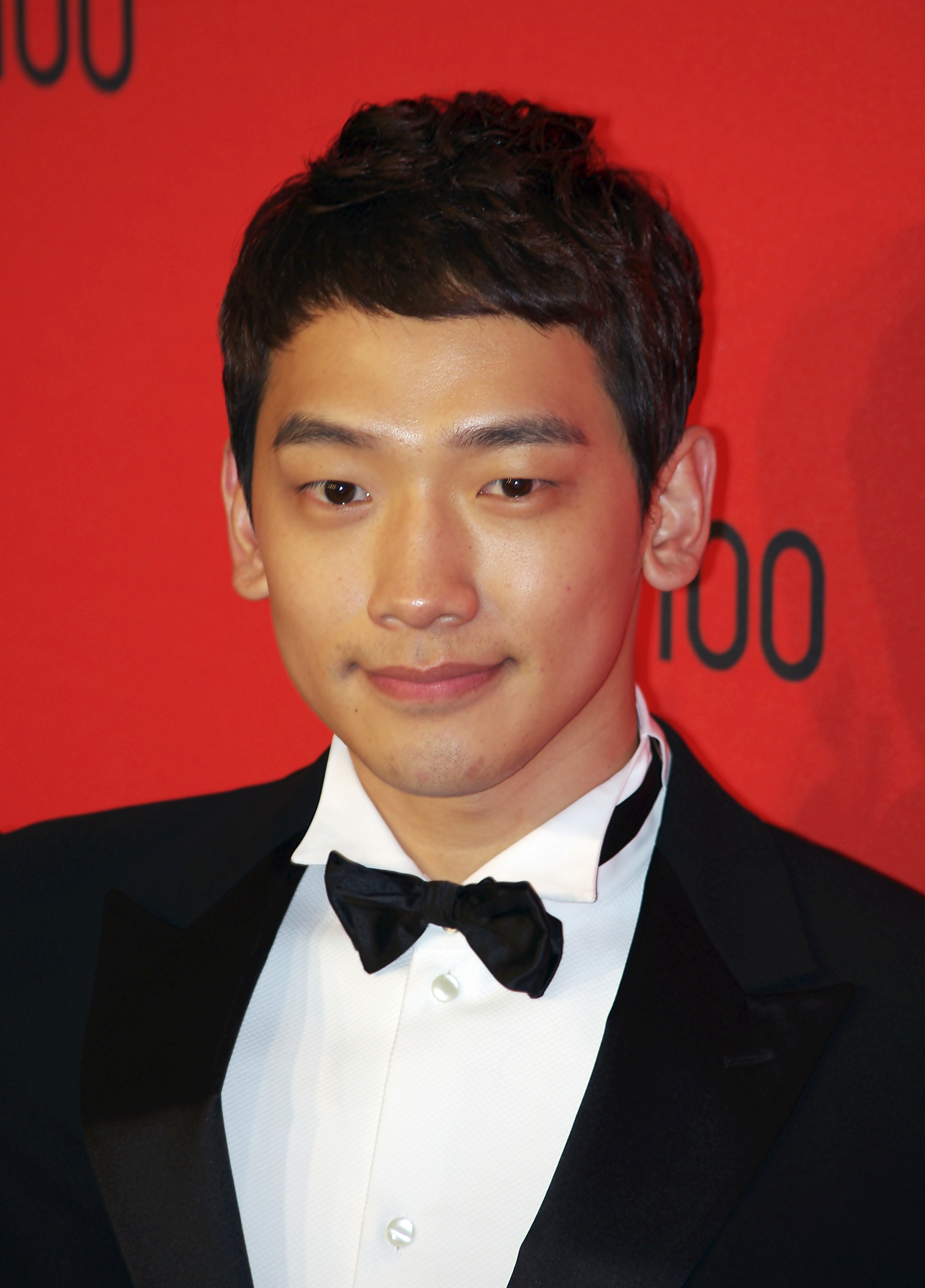
Rain at the 2011 Time 100 gala at Lincoln Center in New York City

From 2003 until 2018, the Korean Music Festival was held in Los Angeles as a way to keep Korean Americans in touch with Korean culture. In 2006, Rain held sold-out concerts in New York City and Las Vegas as part of his Rain's Coming World Tour. From 2003 until 2018, the Korean Music Festival was held in Los Angeles as a way to keep Korean Americans in touch with Korean culture. In 2010, SM Entertainment held the SMTown Live '10 World Tour with dates in Los Angeles, Paris, Tokyo, and New York.

Notable K-pop concerts in the United States in 2011 include the KBS Concert at the New York Korea Festival, the K-Pop Masters Concert in Las Vegas, and the Korean Music Wave in Google, which was held at Google's headquarters in Mountain View, California.

In 2009, the Wonder Girls became the first K-pop artist to debut on the Billboard Hot 100 singles chart. They went on to join the Jonas Brothers on the Jonas Brothers World Tour 2009. In 2010, they toured 20 cities in the United States, Canada and Mexico, and were named House of Blues "Artist of the Month" for June.

2012 marked a breakthrough year for K-pop in North America. At the start of the year, Girls' Generation performed the English version of "The Boys" on the late-night talk show The Late Show with David Letterman and also on the daytime talk show Live! with Kelly, becoming the first South Korean musical act to perform on these shows, and the first South Korean act to perform on syndicated television in the United States. In the same year, the group formed their first sub-unit, entitled Girls' Generation-TTS, or simply "TTS", composed of members Taeyeon, Tiffany, and Seohyun. The subgroup's debut EP, Twinkle, peaked at #126 on the Billboard 200. In May, SMTown returned to California again with the SMTown Live World Tour III in Anaheim. In August, as part of their New Evolution Global Tour, 2NE1 held their first American concert in the New York Metropolitan Area at the Prudential Center of Newark, New Jersey. On October 13, the first KCON music festival was held at the Verizon Wireless Amphitheatre in Irvine, California. In November, as part of their Alive Tour, BigBang held their first solo concert in America, visiting the Honda Center in Los Angeles and the Prudential Center in Newark. The tickets sold out in only a few hours, and additional dates were added. On November 13, the American singer-songwriter Madonna and backup dancers performed "Gangnam Style" alongside Psy during a concert at Madison Square Garden in New York City. Psy later told reporters that his gig with Madonna had "topped his list of accomplishments."

On January 29, 2013, Billboard, one of America's most popular music magazines, launched Billboard K-Town, an online column on its website that covered K-pop news, artists, concerts, and chart information. In March of that year, f(x) performed at the K-Pop Night Out at SXSW in Austin, Texas, alongside The Geeks, who represented South Korean rock. f(x) was the first K-pop group ever to perform at SXSW.

Mnet hosted its Kcon event in NY and LA in July 2016.

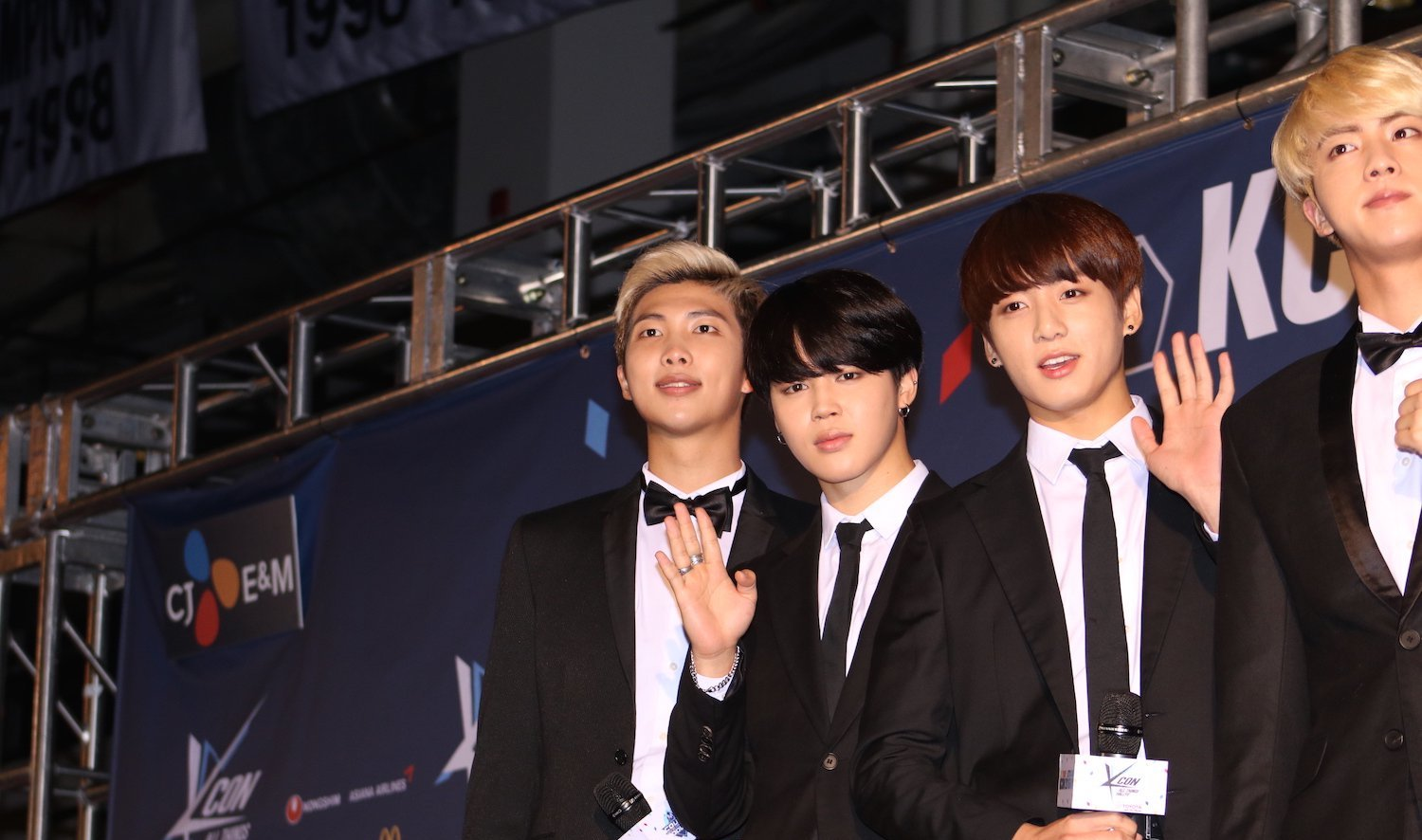
BTS on the red carpet at KCON New York 2016

In May 2014, Exo became the fourth K-pop act to enter the Billboard 200 that year after 2NE1, Girls' Generation and Wonder Girls were the first K-pop act to chart on Billboard 200.

In October 2016, BTS's album Wings became the highest-charting K-pop album in the Billboard 200. Love Yourself: Tear debuted at number one on the US Billboard 200, becoming the first K-pop album to top the US albums chart, and the highest-charting album by an Asian act. In August 2020, their song "Dynamite" topped the Billboard Hot 100, becoming the first K-pop song to become a number-one single in the US.

In June 2018, girl group Blackpink became the first K-pop girl group to chart within the top 50 of Billboard 200 album chart; their first EP Square Up debuted at No. 40, with lead single "Ddu-Du Ddu-Du" charting at No. 55 on the Billboard Hot 100 chart, the highest-charting song by a K-pop girl group. Since then, they have beaten their own record with "Ice Cream" peaking at No. 13 on the Billboard Hot 100.

In 2017, BTS was nominated for the Top Social Artist Award at the 2017 Billboard Music Awards. Their winning of the award marks the first time a South Korean group has won a Billboard award, and the second time a South Korean artist has won the award, after Psy's win in 2013. BTS won the award at the 2017, 2018, and 2019 Billboard Music Awards, as well as Top Duo/Group in 2019. They performed at the 2017 American Music Awards and the 2018 Billboard Music Awards, making them one of the first South Korean groups to have performed at either awards show. BTS's album Love Yourself: Tear reached #1 on the Billboard 200, making it the first South Korean act to do so. Additionally, BTS's single "Fake Love" debuted at #10 on the Billboard Hot 100, making them the second South Korean artist to chart in the top ten.

On August 21, 2020, BTS' song "Dynamite" debuted at number 1 on the Billboard Hot 100, making it the first ever single of a South Korean artist to top the Billboard chart. Their next single, "Life Goes On", also managed to top the chart upon release on November 20, 2020.

On June 10, 2023, Twice became the first girl group to sell out a show at SoFi Stadium in Los Angeles, California during their Ready to Be World Tour.

In the summer of 2025, Netflix and Sony Pictures Animation released KPop Demon Hunters, which depicted two fictional K-pop groups, a girl trio named Huntrix and a demon boy band named Saja Boys. Several of the songs from the soundtrack album dominated the Billboard charts.

=== Mexico ===
South Korean media in Mexico experienced a surge in 2002 after Mexican governor, Arturo Montiel Rojas, visited South Korea. From his trip, he brought South Korean series, movies, and other programs to Mexico State's broadcasting channel: Televisión Mexiquense (channel 34). Korean dramas exposed the Mexican public to South Korean products and spurred interest in other aspects of Korean culture. K-pop began to gain ground in Mexico due to the series the music accompanied. Fans particularly sought out the music of soundtracks respective to South Korean dramas that were broadcast.

However, K-pop's arrival to Mexico is also attributed to the influence of Japanese media in Mexico and the introduction of PIU (Pump It Up). The comic convention, La Mole, commenced selling Japanese comics and music and later commenced to sell K-pop. PIUs combined gaming and dancing, introducing the Mexican youth to South Korean gaming software and generating interest in South Korean music.

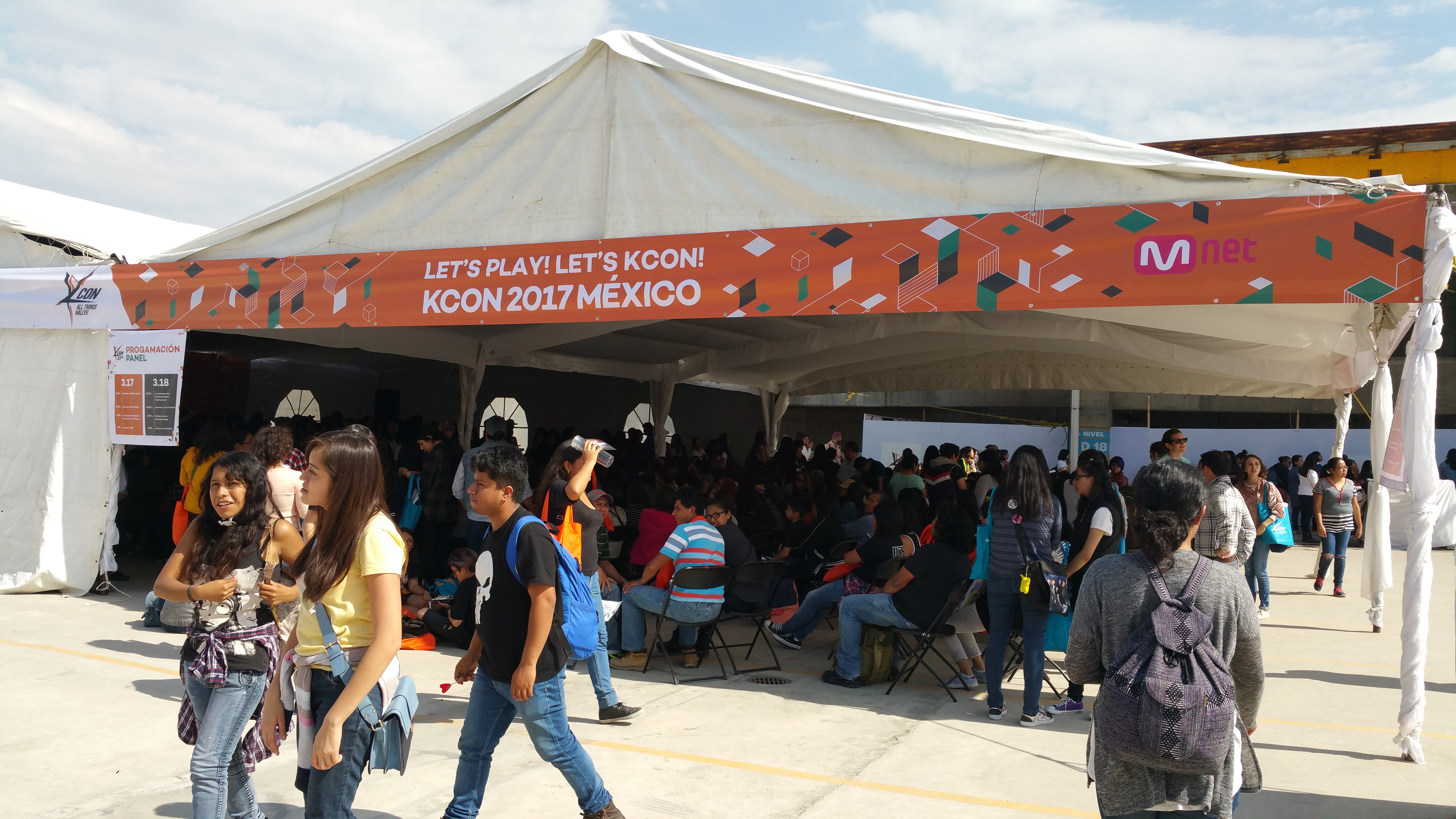
KCON in Mexico City

K-pop's presence in Mexico can be outlined through the growing number of South Korean music acts in the country. In recent years, the number of K-pop concerts in Mexico has risen and branched into other portions of the country. Idol groups, including BigBang and NU'EST, have visited Mexico through their respective world tours. JYJ's Kim Junsu became the first South Korean star to perform solo. His concert held in Mexico City sold out in advance. The Music Bank World Tour also brought various acts to the Mexican public. Many of those groups covered widely known songs, such as Exo's cover of Sabor A Mi.

In 2017, Mexico also became the first Latin American country to host KCON. The two-day convention held on March 17–18 brought over 33,000 fans to Arena Ciudad de México. Much like artists during Music Bank, idols covered Spanish songs.

The strength and large number of fan clubs have continuously helped promote and support K-pop across the country. Over 70 fan clubs dedicated to South Korean music are present in Mexico, bringing together around 30,000 fans. Although many fan clubs were created around 2003, they achieved a public presence in 2005 when South Korea's ex-president Roh Moo Hyun visited Mexico for a meeting with Mexico's ex-president Vicente Fox Quesada. Around 30 hallyu fan clubs held a "rally" asking Roh to bring actors Jang Dong-gun and Ahn Jae-wook to their country.

Demonstrations have continued into recent years. On May 13, 2013, a large march was held in Mexico City's Zócalo. Called KPOP: Massive March K–Pop Mexico II, it was the second mass march that brought together hundreds of avid K-Pop fans.

However, larger fan club organizations in Mexico receive indirect or direct support from Korean cultural programs. KOFICE (Korea Foundation for International Cultural Exchange) and the Korean Cultural Center, Mexico City often work in conjunction with fan clubs. These larger organizations contain multiple fan clubs within their structure. The three largest are MexiCorea, Hallyu Mexican Lovers, and HallyuMx. Both MexiCorea and Hallyu Mexican Lovers are supported by KOFICE while HallyuMx previously worked with the Korean Cultural Center and the Embassy of the Republic of Korea in Mexico.

== South America ==
Many idol groups have loyal fan bases in Latin America. Since 2009, about 260 fan clubs with a total of over 20,000 and 8,000 active members have been formed in Chile and Peru, respectively.

In recent years, an increasing number of K-pop groups have performed in Latin America.

In 2011, the United Cube Concert was held in São Paulo, shortly after the second round of the first K-Pop Cover Dance Festival was held in Brazil, with MBLAQ as judges.

In March 2012, JYJ performed in Chile and Peru. When the group arrived at the Jorge Chávez International Airport in Peru for the JYJ World Tour Concert, they were escorted by airport security officials through a private exit due to safety reasons concerning the large number of fans (over 3,000). At the Explanada Sur del Estadio Monumental in Lima, some fans camped out for days to see JYJ. In April, Caracol TV and Arirang TV jointly aired a K-pop reality show in Colombia. In September, Junsu became the first K-pop idol to perform solo in Brazil and Mexico, after the Wonder Girls in Monterrey in 2009. The concerts sold out well in advance. That year there were 70 K-pop fan clubs in Mexico, with at least 60,000 members altogether.

In January 2014, Kim Hyung-jun performed in Peru, Chile, and Bolivia, becoming the first K-pop idol to perform in Bolivia. When he arrived in Peru, where the tour began, about 1,000 fans cheered for him, followed him wherever Kim Hyung-joon went, and they caused serious traffic jams. Fans were also seen pitching their tents outside the concert venue for days before the actual concert.

In 2013, the boy group Super Junior performed in four South American countries ― Brazil, Argentina, Chile and Peru—as part of its Super Show 5 tour. Additionally, that same year on November 7, it had a show at Mexico City Arena, which attracted over 17,000 fans. Super Junior performed on April 27, 2018, at Mexico City Arena, a stage where various famous Latin American artists such as Ozuna, J Balvin, and Marco Antonio Solís also performed in 2018. NU'EST held concerts in Mexico, Brazil, Chile and Peru in 2014. In 2017, BTS visited Brazil and Chile where it performed as part of the Live Trilogy Episode III, the Wings Tour. On March 11–12, 2017, BTS held concerts in Santiago, Chile, and in São Paulo, Brazil, on March 19–20. As rookies, Dreamcatcher visited 4 cities in Brazil as part of their 2017 Fly High world tour, and later returned to Latin America in 2018, visiting Argentina, Chile, Peru, Colombia and Panama as part of their Welcome to the Dream World world tour.

== Europe ==
In 2009, singer Hwangbo entered the European music industry for a short period when she released the single R2song, reaching # 1 on the world's largest dance music site JunoDownload, being successful in the United Kingdom, Europe, as well as South Korea; becoming the first Asian artist to achieve it.

In 2010, both the SMTown Live '10 World Tour and the Super Junior Super Show 4 Tour were held in Paris.

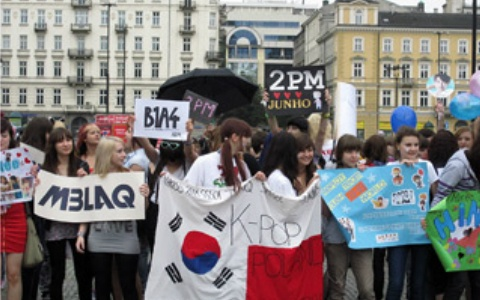
K-pop fans in Warsaw holding a South Korean-Polish flag as well as banners of various boy bands

In February 2011, Teen Top performed at the Sala Apolo concert hall in Barcelona. In May, Rain became the first K-pop artist to perform in Germany, during the Dresden Music Festival. JYJ also performed in both Berlin and Barcelona. BigBang flew to Belfast and won the Best Worldwide Act during the 2011 MTV EMAs in Northern Ireland. In Poland, the K-pop Star Exhibition was held in the Warsaw Korean Culture Center.

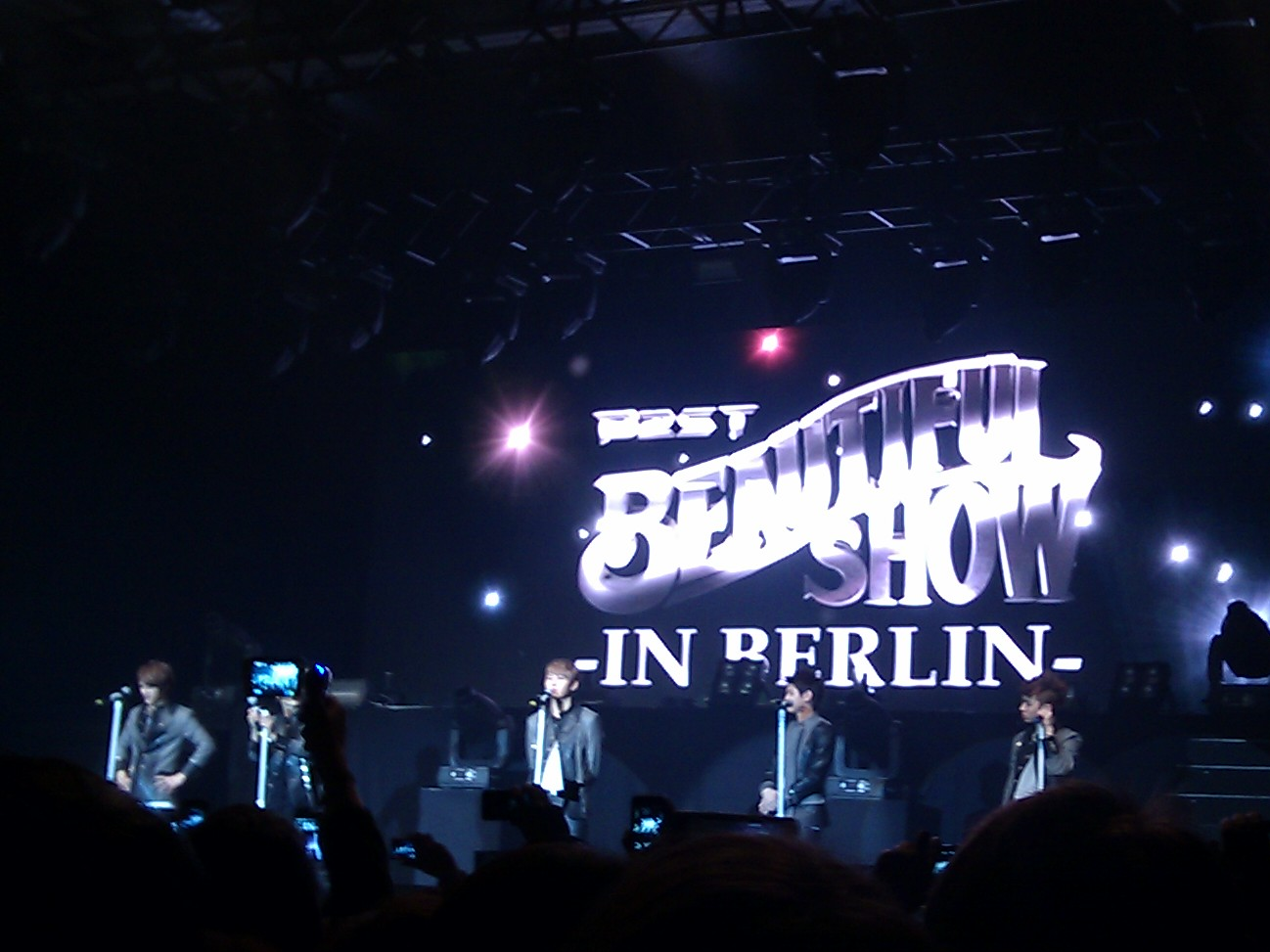
Beast performing at the Beautiful Show in Berlin

In February 2012, Beast held their Beautiful Show in Berlin. According to the Berliner Zeitung, many fans who attended were not just from Germany but also from neighbouring countries such as France and Switzerland. Also in February, the Music Bank World Tour drew more than 10,000 fans to the Palais Omnisports de Paris-Bercy. That year, artists such as Beast and 4Minute performed during the United Cube Concert in London, where the MBC Korean Culture Festival was also held. When Shinee arrived at the London Heathrow Airport for a concert at the Odeon West End in the same year, part of the airport became temporarily overrun by frenzied fans. The reservation system of the Odeon West End crashed for the first time one minute after ticket sales began as the concert drew an unexpectedly large response. At this time, Shinee also held a 30-minute performance at the Abbey Road Studio. The ticket demand for this performance was so high that fashion magazine Elle gave away forty tickets through a lottery, and the performance was also televised in Japan through six different channels. Also in 2012, BigBang won the Best Fan category in the Italian TRL Awards.

In October 2016, BTS's album Wings became the first Korean album to chart in the UK Albums Chart, reaching #62.

In March 2022, Kpop.Flex took place at Deutsche Bank Park Stadium in Frankfurt, Germany. Over 65,000 fans attended from over 80 different countries.

In 2022, the term "K pop" was included in the French dictionary Larousse.

=== Russia ===
On September 6, 2011, 57 dance teams took part in the K-pop Cover Dance Festival. During the second round of the competition, Shinee flew to Moscow as judges, also performing for Russian fans. The following year, Russian youths launched K-Plus, a Korean culture magazine, and the number of Russian K-pop fans was reported at 50,000.

On February 3, 2014, Park Jung-min became the first South Korean singer to hold a solo concert in Moscow. B.A.P held concerts during their Live On Earth 2016 World Tour at the Adrenaline Stadium, and again in 2017 during their Party Baby tour at YotaSpace. In 2018, Got7 performed at Adrenaline Stadium for their Eyes on You tour. On October 7, 2018 Zico performed at a Moscow club during his King of the Zungle tour.

== Oceania ==
A number of K-pop idols have hailed from Oceania, including Blackpink's Rosé, One Way's Peter Hyun, DPR Ian, Stray Kids' Bang Chan and Felix, EvoL's Hayana, and Led Apple's Jang Han-byul.

In 2011, a K-Pop Festival was held at the ANZ Stadium in Sydney, featuring Girls' Generation, TVXQ, Beast, Shinee, 4minute, Miss A, 2AM, and MBLAQ. In August 2012, NU'EST visited Sydney Harbour and the University of New South Wales, as judges of a K-pop contest being held there. The following year, 4Minute were judges at the same contest in Sydney. In October, Psy toured Australia after his single "Gangnam Style" reached number one in Australia on the ARIA charts.

In May 2016, B.A.P held a concert in Auckland, becoming the first group to perform in New Zealand. In September 2017, KCON was held at Qudos Bank Arena in Sydney, Australia. The lineup for the event was Pentagon, Wanna One, Girl's Day, Cosmic Girls (WJSN), Exo, SF9, Victon, Monsta X, and UP10TION.

In 2023, Twice became the first K-pop act to perform at Marvel Stadium in Melbourne for their Ready to Be World Tour. Other acts who have toured Australia and New Zealand include Ive, Itzy, Stray Kids, P1Harmony, Kim Jaejoong and Epik High.

=== Australia ===
The growth of K-pop in Australia has been supported by Asian-Australian communities and multicultural broadcasting, including SBS PopAsia. Local fandom encompasses university clubs, social networks, and dance communities, creating social networks and opportunities for aspiring performers. Since 2012, Australia has become a recruitment location for major South Korean entertainment agencies, with many Australian K-pop idols such as Rosé discovered through in-country auditions. Beyond its musical popularity, K-pop has contributed to cultural exchange between Australia and South Korea, offering "aspirational models of Asian representation that remain largely absent from Australian mainstream media".

A number of Australia-based dance groups perform dance covers of K-pop music and teach K-pop choreography. In the K-Pop World Festival competition, AO Crew has represented Australia three times—in 2013, 2014, and 2016. Another Australian dance cover group, IMI Dance, was the opening show for the RapBeat Show in 2017. Hanni, one of two Australian members of NewJeans, participated in a K-pop dance group in Melbourne prior to eventually moving to South Korea to begin training as an idol.

== See also ==
- Korean Wave
- Korean idol
- Miracle on the Han River
- Tourism in South Korea
- Economy of South Korea
- Fandom culture in South Korea
