= Cultural technology =

South Korean media marketing system

Cultural technology (Korean: 문화기술; Hanja: 文化技術; RR: munhwagisul) is a system used by South Korean talent agencies to promote K-pop culture throughout the world as part of the Korean Wave. The system was developed by Lee Soo-man, founder of talent agency and record company SM Entertainment.

== History ==
=== Coinage ===
During a speech at the Stanford Graduate School of Business in 2011, Lee said he coined the term "cultural technology" as a system about fourteen years prior, when S.M. Entertainment decided to promote its K-pop artists to all of Asia. In the late 1990s, Lee and his colleagues created a manual on cultural technology, which specified the steps needed to popularize K-pop artists outside South Korea.

"The manual, which all S.M. employees are instructed to learn, explains when to bring in foreign composers, producers, and choreographers; what chord progressions to use in what country; the precise color of eyeshadow a performer should wear in a particular country; the exact hand gestures he or she should make; and the camera angles to be used in the videos (a three-hundred-and-sixty-degree group shot to open the video, followed by a montage of individual closeups)," according to The New Yorker.

The term "cultural technology," apart from Lee's systemized definition, can be traced back to the lectures of Michael White, an Australian social worker, educator, and therapeutic theorist and his works Narrative Means to Therapeutic Ends (1990) and Maps of Narrative Practice (2007). Its usage may also date further back to French philosopher Michel Foucault (1977). South Korean computer scientist Kwangyun Wohn said he coined the term "culture technology" in 1994. Cultural technology has also been one of six technology initiatives of the South Korean government since 2001. In regards to cultural technology, the Korean Wave is considered one of the most successful outcomes of government support of exporting Korean entertainment products.

=== The Four Core Stages ===
The cultural technology system originally employed by SM Entertainment since the 1990s existed in four stages: Casting, Training, Producing, and Marketing/Managing. Each of these four stages were curated to help spread the Hallyu wave through the development of its artists, and are present in the strategies of many other South Korean talent agencies when creating, debuting, and marketing groups.

==== Casting ====
While the majority of K-pop idols are from South Korea, some are from Japan, China, or Thailand. Many of Korea's entertainment companies, such as SM's Global Auditions, Bighit's Hit It auditions, and YG's Next Generation, host worldwide auditions. Scouting and streetcasting are also common, with members like BTS's Jin recruited for their looks or other surface reasons. Sometimes, casting agents go to dance schools to recruit the top dancers to be trained further at the entertainment company.

==== Training ====
Idols train extensively before debut. They receive training in dance, vocal activities, presentation, and other areas that will benefit them in the industry. Oftentimes, this training will last for years at a time, and trainees are in the proverbial dungeon.

Before debut, idols and groups attempt to gain fans through pre-debut activities. SM Entertainment has a system in place called SM Rookies, which is a pre-debut team that hosts concerts and releases videos that strengthen the fanbase of the group even before their first single is released. Other forms of pre-debut activities include featuring in other, more seasoned idols' videos—like Nu'est in Orange Caramel or Exo in Girls' Generation-TTS Twinkle or BTS in Jo Kwon. One particular method of pre-debut training is coupled with casting in production shows, like Sixteen and Produce 101, in which members for a final group are selected and trained.

==== Producing ====
The production of music is integral in cultural technology. For cultural technology, production of music helps create differentiated content to set trends in the K-pop world—trends that vary from music to also costume, choreography, and music videos. SM in particular focuses heavily on the expansion globally. Some companies also outsource production to more internationally famed parties, like Cube Entertainment's partnership with Skrillex for 4minute's Act. 7.

==== Marketing/Management ====
In the marketing and management stage, talent agencies seek to broaden their reach. Often, idols have potential for being actors and actresses in dramas, or hosts/permanent members of variety shows like Kim Hee-chul in Knowing Bros. This omnidirectional marketing lineup ranges over lifestyle and seeks to reach many aspects of living, such as music, TV, drama, entertainment, sports, and fashion. Often, older groups like Super Junior can find new life during this process, as companies experiment constantly to develop the best marketing for the best management system.

Marketing also aspires to branch out to international audiences, sometimes via the implementation of variety shows. Despite being primarily in Korean, these variety shows are accessible to all due to the easily understood nature of shows—game-oriented shows like Run BTS! or consistently subbed shows like Weekly Idol.

== Evolution into New Culture Technology ==
In February 2016, SM hosted a press conference discussing the future of SM and its cultural technology. Lee Soo-man announced the implementation of New Culture Technology, an SM-specific system. While SM's cultural technology in the past relied on local, Korean artists like Rain and BoA, the updated model tries to embed more and more foreign singers from strategic markets into larger girl or boy bands. These imported singers are then used to promote their acts back in their respective home countries.

New Culture Technology is five projects—SM Station, EDM, Digital Platforms, Rookies Entertainment, and MCN—and one experimental group, NCT. It is a convergence and expansion of SM's four core culture technologies developed and deals heavily with interaction and the desire to innovate through communication.

=== SM Station ===
SM announced their intention of creating a new song every week for 52 weeks. Through this constant output of music, they intend to stray away from conventional forms of music and show active movement in the digital music market and physical album market through freely and continuously releasing music. Additionally, this SM Station will feature collaborations between artists, producers, composers, and company brands outside the SM label.

The name of SM Station is both derived from the radio station and the metaphorical train station.

=== NCT ===
Neo Culture Technology (NCT) introduced the "Interactive" idea. SM company tried to connect the targeting market, customers, and artist, in order to innovate the K-pop culture.

NCT (Neo Culture Technology) is an artist group formed by SM to embody the concepts of cultural technology; making use of numerous groups and combinations, SM aims to create a global appeal for NCT.

Since 2023, there are six NCT groups, who debuted on the digital song sales: NCT U, NCT 127, NCT Dream, WayV, NCT DoJaeJung, and NCT Wish.

As of June 2026, the group consists of 24 members: Johnny, Taeyong, Yuta, Kun, Doyoung, Ten, Jaehyun, Winwin, Jungwoo, Xiaojun, Hendery, Renjun, Jeno, Haechan, Jaemin, Yangyang, Chenle, Jisung, Sion, Riku, Yushi, Jaehee, Ryo, and Sakuya.

ScreaM Records

ScreaM Records has been released by SM Entertainment as an EDM label since 2016 for "SM TOWN: New Culture Technology". ScreaM Records is made for "performances made to be enjoyed". It collaborates with inside and outside Korean well-known EDM DJs.

ScreaM Records has first launched collaborated song "Wave" E-Mart's home electronics store, Electro Mart.

"Our goal is to provide opportunities to producers who have yet to be discovered and produce world famous DJs from the Asian scene." a ScreaM Records representative said.

== Three stages of globalization ==
According to Lee, there are three stages necessary to popularize Korean culture outside South Korea: exporting the product, collaborating with international companies to expand the product's presence abroad, and finally creating a joint venture with international companies. As part of their joint ventures with international companies, South Korean talent agencies may hire foreign composers, producers, and choreographers to ensure K-pop songs feel "local" to foreign countries.

== See also ==
- K-pop
- Korean idol
  - Korean idols in advertising
- Korean Wave
  - Fandom culture in South Korea
- Celebrity branding
- Content creation
- Content intelligence
- Content marketing
- Creator economy
- Influencer marketing
