= Fan rice =

Charitable rice wreaths sent by fans in South Korean popular culture

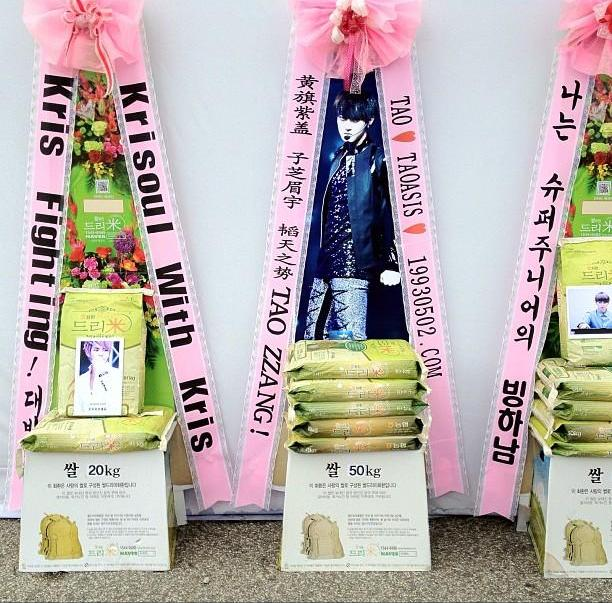
Fan rice for idol band Exo

Fan rice (Korean: 쌀 기부; RR: ssal gibu; lit. 'rice donation'), usually arranged as rice wreaths (쌀 화환; ssal hwahwan; literally "rice wreath"), consists of quantities of rice purchased by fans in an entertainer's name and displayed at concerts, fan meetings, press conferences, musicals, and other events. The wreaths typically consist of stacks of rice bags arranged on decorative stands and accompanied by photographs, ribbons, banners, and messages identifying the entertainer and the fans or fan clubs providing the support. The amount of donated rice can vary between a few kilograms and several tons.

Fan rice functions as both a form of fan support and charitable giving. After the event, the rice is donated to charitable organizations or people in need, often in the entertainer's name, with the recipient determined by the entertainer, the participating fans, or both, depending on the project. The practice became particularly associated with South Korean popular-culture fandoms, especially K-pop fans, as a way of publicly demonstrating support for an entertainer while directing fan spending toward charitable causes.

== History ==
=== Origins and early spread ===
The practice of sending rice wreaths in support of entertainers is generally traced to fans of Shin Hye-sung, a member of the South Korean group Shinhwa. At Shin's first solo concert on 11 August 2007, fans sent 260 kg of rice wreaths in his name. The event came to be regarded as the beginning of rice-wreath support within Korean entertainment fandom; TenAsia later described the practice as having developed from Shin's 2007 concert into an established form of fandom culture.

The practice spread to other entertainment fandoms over the following years. By 2010, Korean welfare media described a growing "rice-donation fandom culture" (쌀기부 팬덤문화), in which fan clubs sent rice wreaths to concerts, musicals, fan meetings, and television production presentations, with the rice later donated to people in need. Some fan groups designed customized wreaths, while the destination of the rice varied by project. At a 2010 fan meeting for Shinhwa member Kim Dong-wan, fans from seven countries sent rice wreaths whose rice was to be donated in Kim's name to a recipient selected by him and his fans; Sungmin of Super Junior similarly donated 1.5 tons received from fans in seven countries to a sheltered workshop for people with disabilities.

Overseas participation had become a notable part of the practice by this period. Bokjiro documented wreaths sent by fans in China, Taiwan, Thailand, Hong Kong, Malaysia, Brunei, and other countries, while the head of rice-wreath company Dreame estimated in 2010 that overseas Korean Wave fans accounted for around 70 percent of the company's fan orders. A follow-up report in 2011, citing Dreame, stated that 160,641 kg of rice had been donated through its wreath service during 2010, around six times the amount reported for 2009; entertainers accounted for 63 tonnes of the total.

=== Growth and international participation ===
During the early 2010s, rice wreaths became increasingly prominent at large-scale K-pop events and grew substantially in size. In February 2012, fans of Beast from South Korea, China, Japan, Singapore, and other countries sent 5,835.9 kg of rice wreaths and 8,036 coal briquettes for the group's first world tour; the displays stretched for approximately 150 metres at the Olympic Gymnastics Arena in Seoul. The following month, fans of BigBang sent approximately 13 tonnes of rice wreaths and more than 2,000 coal briquettes for the Seoul opening of the group's first world tour. Fan organizations in countries including Malaysia, Singapore, Kuwait, the Philippines, China, and Japan participated in the project. Korean media at the time described rice and coal-briquette wreaths as among the most prevalent forms of charitable activity organized by entertainment fandoms.

The increasingly international character and scale of rice-wreath projects continued into 2013. At G-Dragon's Seoul concerts in March, fans from 14 countries sent 500 rice wreaths representing 9.91 tonnes of rice. Fans of Key of Shinee also sent rice wreaths in support of his appearance in the musical Catch Me If You Can; by February 2013, 2,113 kg of rice and 550 coal briquettes associated with the project had been donated through World Vision Korea for disadvantaged children and older people. Contemporary reporting described "rice wreaths", or "fan rice", as an increasingly common way for fans to combine support for entertainers with charitable giving.

By 2014, rice wreaths had become a familiar feature of concerts and production presentations. TenAsia described them as an established form of fan support and reported that their use had expanded beyond idol fandoms to supporters of established singers and sports figures. The publication, citing Dreame, also reported that rice donations handled by the company had increased by around 200 percent annually between 2009 and 2012. At the production presentation for the television drama Diary of a Night Watchman on 29 July 2014, fans of Yunho from 23 countries sent approximately 32.5 tonnes of rice wreaths, which was reported as a record for a single fan-rice project at the time. Of the rice collected, 24 tonnes was later donated through Korea Food for the Hungry International and distributed among 45 welfare facilities in ten regions of South Korea for older people, people with disabilities, children, and other recipients in need.

=== Diversification and continued use ===
As rice-wreath culture became established, charitable fan projects also diversified beyond rice. By the mid-2010s, Korean media described fandoms sponsoring the construction of wells, providing school furniture and medical treatment, and creating so-called "star forests" through tree-planting projects. Shinhwa fans, for example, funded 1,130 trees for a "Shinhwa Forest" in Seoul in connection with the group's 15th anniversary, while other fandoms sponsored wells and similar projects in countries including Cambodia and Myanmar. TenAsia characterized this development as an evolution of earlier fan-gift culture, in which spending once directed toward gifts for entertainers was increasingly redirected toward charitable projects carried out in their names.

By the late 2010s, this broader form of fan-organized philanthropy encompassed donations of food and pet supplies, blood-donation certificates, menstrual products, environmental campaigns, and volunteering. Seoul Shinmun reported in 2019 that rice donation remained one of the established forms of fandom charity, although declining rice consumption and changing charitable interests had encouraged some fan communities to direct their activities toward other causes.

Rice wreaths nevertheless continued to be used as a form of event-based fan support in the 2020s. In August 2022, the official fan club of singer Young Tak donated 1,220 kg of rice from congratulatory wreaths sent for his Tak Show concert to the Community Chest of Korea. The rice was designated for meal support for vulnerable groups ahead of the Chuseok holiday.

== Characteristics ==
Fans of K-pop buy bags of rice and donate them to their favorite artists. Rice is sorted out in 20 kg bags, arranged into "towers" by dedicated companies who purchase the rice from local farmers and transport it to the venues according to the orders from the fan clubs. Fans often inscribe special or personal messages onto the bags or attach photos to them. Donating rice indicates that fans take greater social responsibility besides showing their respect and support to their favorite artists. Sending rice bags to venues have also appeared in Japan, as part of the K-pop wave.

== Notable donations ==
- In February 2012, Super Junior member Kyuhyun donated 2.54 tonnes of rice received from fans during his appearance in the musical The Three Musketeers to more than 200 low-income and single-parent households in Nowon District, Seoul. Kyuhyun had previously donated approximately two tonnes of fan rice from each of two earlier musical productions to disadvantaged families.
- In September 2015, international fan clubs of TVXQ member Yunho raised 35.94 tonnes of rice to celebrate the broadcast of his web drama I Order You. Of the total, 9.5 tonnes, valued at approximately ₩29 million, was donated through the Gwangju Community Chest of Korea to low-income children and older people living alone in Gwangju, Yunho's hometown.
- In March 2016, 64 fan clubs of BigBang sent 20 tonnes of rice wreaths for the Seoul finale of the group's Made World Tour. During the concert, member stated that it was the largest amount of rice wreaths the group had received since its debut and that the rice would be donated to charitable causes.
