= Korean idols in advertising =

Use of South Korean musical celebrities in marketing

In South Korea, Korean celebrities often work with South Korean commercial and advertisement industries. Companies are quoted as saying that they use Korean idols to change their brands' image to a young, fresh one and promote their goods to a younger, wider, and global audience. This page focuses specifically on Korean idols in domestic and foreign advertisements. The items or goods that Korean idols advertise are not limited and can include shopping malls, school uniforms, health insurance, cars, and water filtration devices. They can also appear in commercials that promote common goods such as driving safety, environmental health, and safe cell phone use.

== Songs and music videos as forms of advertisements ==
Including the cost of travel, costumes, staffs, special effects, and many other factors, most K-pop music videos have high costs; T-ara's song "Lovey-Dovey" and B.A.P's "One Shot" are said to have cost about 1 million dollars each. To support these costly videos, product placements frequently appear in idol groups' music videos. Most common product placements in idols' music videos tend to food, clothing, cell phones, headphones, beauty care, and drinks. Idols emphasize their product placements by using them, playing with them, or holding the items close to their faces. Examples include "Level headphones" in Exo's "Call Me Baby", "Baskin-Robbins ice cream" in Red Velvet's "Ice Cream Cake", "Mr Pizza's pizza" in SNSD's "Lion Heart", and countless more.

Addictive melodies and tunes are common marketing techniques used in commercials. In some commercials, idols sing a short song dedicated to the product they are selling, such as SHINee's short commercial song that emphasized characteristics of a Korean snack called "bbushuh bbushuh". Sometimes, idols alter their songs or trending songs to advertise a good. More uncommon but not rare, there are some instances when idol groups develop whole, new songs or music videos solely to advertise goods. For example, a girl group, Apink, and a boy group, B.A.P., collaborated to create a controversial song and a music video called "Skoolooks" that advertised Skoolooks' new uniform for girls and boys. Another example is SNSD's song and music video, "Cooky"."Cooky" was also the name of an LG smartphone, and in the music video, the members can be seen dancing and playing with the "Cooky" smartphones as they sing "Cooky, cooky". These commercial music videos have the same characteristics of standard K-pop music video with its addictive hook and 3–4 minutes time length.

In other cases, idols use concepts or themes, which they had incorporated into their music videos, in commercials. For example, the idol group, Exo, used a superpower concept, where each member had a special superpower, in their music video "Mama". And in a KFC commercial, each of the group members used a superpower concept, which they had in their music video, to promote the flavors and characteristics of KFC's new menu, hot chicken mala.

== Idols in advertisements targeting international audiences ==
Korean idols not only advertise domestic products, they often advertise global or international products. For example, in SNSD's music video, "Party", members can be seen playing with a toy figure of an airplane with a "Thai Air" logo. In other commercials, groups Got7 appear in TV commercials in Thailand or groups like Twice appear in Japanese TV commercials for mobile. Continuing on, in various countries, there are Pop-up stores that sell fan-goods, such as Twice-themed cafe in Japan and BTS-themed cafe in Pakistan. These international pop-up stores are examples of idols being used as marketing tools to sell goods overseas. In addition, online shopping websites such as Amazon and other websites help distribute goods, advertised by Korean idols, to international fans. Korean online shopping websites help this distribution by including multiple language functions (such as English, Chinese, and Japanese) and allowing foreign-language speakers to navigate their websites easily. These websites often specifically target international fans by providing coupons or incentives for international shoppers from specific countries (Examples of this include providing free shipping from certain countries).

== Advertisements promoting Korean idols ==
In Korea, posters promoting debuting idols or popular idols can be found on buses and posters in movie theaters. On several occasions, idol groups' fans often use their own money to promote their favorite group or group members. For example, on an idol group's anniversary or a member's birthday, posters advertising them or a single idol can be seen in many Korean subways. In Times Square at New York, idols had appeared in Times Square advertisements as international fans attempted to celebrate a group's anniversary or a member's upcoming birthday.

== Criticisms and concerns ==
Some fans criticize product placements in music videos as being too shameful, obvious, and commercializing. Other fans had raised concerns about potential corruption or sexual coercion that are recurrently involved in sponsorship and advertisement deals. Thus, rumors often circulate when an idol appears in many advertisements or accumulates popularity too quickly. There are organization and clubs in Korea that are dedicated to matching rookie or unpopular celebrities to rich, powerful sponsors. Sponsors can potentially give advertisement deals, money, and goods in exchange for sexual services.

== See also ==
- "Lollipop", a 2009 promotional single by BigBang and 2NE1 for LG Cyon
- "Cabi Song", a 2010 promotional single by Girls' Generation and 2PM for Caribbean Bay
