= Community Chest of Korea =

Korean non-profit organization

- 사회복지공동모금회
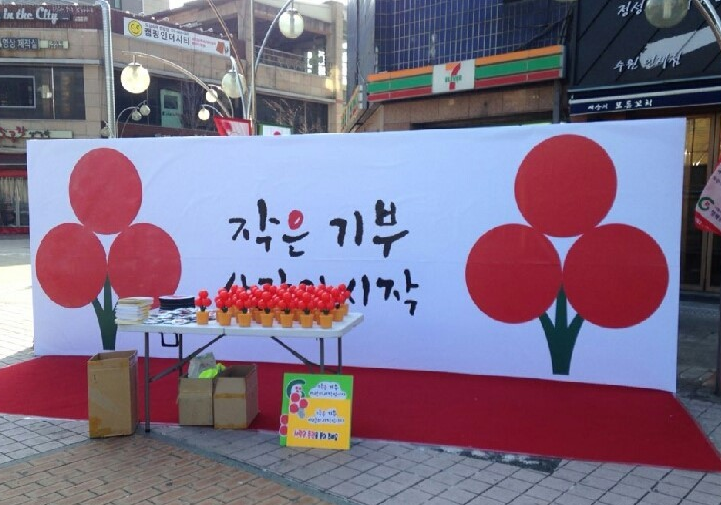
- 수원 사랑의열매 행사
- Founder: People's Solidarity for Participatory Democracy
- Type: Social Enterprise, Non-Profit Organization
- Region served: South Korea
- Key people: Heo Dong Su
- Website: www.chest.or.kr (Korean) eng.chest.or.kr (English)

Community Chest of Korea (Korean: 사회복지공동모금회) is a Korean nonprofit organization, launched in 1998. It is the only government-sanctioned charity within South Korea. It is the country's largest welfare institution. With a community-based fundraising effort, it supports various welfare centers, community projects, and collaborates with other non-profit organizations and NGOs. The honorary ambassador of the Community Chest is Kim Sung-Joo, an announcer and host.

== Activity ==
Community Chest's main activities are raising, distributing, using and managing funds; investigating, studying and promoting fund-raising; and enhancing cooperation with organizations who collect other donations.

The collection is distributed by accepting ongoing applications. It is carried out by presentation to the board of directors that consists of experts from many fields, including the business community and religious circles, and the charity's chairman to raise the transparency and efficiency of distribution.

== History ==
The Community Chest was founded in 1998. Former Prime Minister Kang Yeong-hoon was appointed as the first chairman. In February 1990, the first donation system was started and Kim Seong-soo, the second chairman, was elected. The third chairman elected was Han Seung-heon. and next chairman elected was Kim Young-Jun in April 2004. In December 2007, Community Chest of Korea started an honor society for individuals who have raised over 100 million won (roughly $75,000)

In March 2009, Yun Byeong Chul was appointed chairman and in May, people began to be able to donate online. Heo Dong Soo was elected the 14th chairman in 2014. That same year, Condoleezza Rice visited the organization's headquarters and donated ten million won ($9497) to support the victims of the Sewol ferry disaster. In September 2015 a United Way Worldwide Roundtable on Philanthropy was held in Seoul by the Community Chest of Korea to explore ways to improve community welfare organization throughout the world. The roundtable hosted about 150 influential business donors and community leaders from around the world who signed a "Letter of Intent" to create more opportunities for "caring communities".

== History of donations ==
- In December 2012 Community Chest of Korea began the organization of donations in local groups. In November a welcoming ceremony was held to announce the possibility of international donation to the Community Chest at the Seoul Branch.
- In July 2013 Community Chest Of Korea held a general meeting for the international donation community at Incheon. In December the chairman held a second general meeting for the international donation community.
- Community Chest Of Korea established a new group called the "Sharing Corps". The purpose of this group is develop desirable communities, and support funding and allocation decisions, as well as cultural events.

== Honor Society ==
Since the aim of the Community Chest is to further a culture of donations and charity, it established the Honor Society in December 2007. The Honor Society is for individuals who donate at least 100 million won. The society members care deeply about social problems and contribute to social developing by donation and volunteering. Especially, through Honor Society, Community Chest of Korea makes an effort to solve problems like social and economic inequality and polarization of classes. Members of Honor Society make a declaration to make an effort to help society develop through donation and participation in this group and create a culture for the continual distribution of charity to those in need.

Current members of the Honor Society include celebrities Im Yoona, Bae Suzy, Park Hae-jin, Nayeon, and Wendy.

== Kind Store ==
Independent businesses often donate to Community Chest of Korea through the Kind Store campaign. Kind Store is an effort through which stores can donate some percentage of their total sales. Independent businessmen, small businesses, franchises, academies, and hospitals participate each year in the Kind Store. If some store does a Kind Store campaign, Community Chest of Korea sends stickers that symbolize donation and a signboard.

== Controversy ==
In 2006, this organization was found by the Ministry of Health and Welfare to have several cases of corruption and embezzlement. A total of 164 workers, out of a total 250, were punished for some sort of violation. CCK restructured its staff and appointed new executives. After this information was published publicly the government restricted CCK's activities for a time period. Because of this problem many people of South Korea refused to support the organization and there was a large drop in donations up through 2010.

In 2015, Community Chest of Korea came under controversy for giving a monthly stipend to a celebrity ambassador in South Korea. Because of these many problems, mass media referred to CKK's logo not as symbolizing the "Fruit of Love", but rather the "Fruit of Corruption".
