= Korean idol =

Type of South Korean musical celebrity

An idol (Korean: 아이돌; RR: aidol) is a type of entertainer who works in the field of Korean popular music (K-pop), either as a member of a group or as a solo act. They typically work for an entertainment agency that operates a highly managed star system that idols are produced by and debut under. Idols undergo extensive training in dance, vocal performance, and foreign language, and tend to represent a hybridized convergence of visuals, music, and fashion. Idols maintain a carefully curated public image and social media presence, and dedicate significant time and resources to building relationships with fans through concerts and meetups.

== History ==
In the 1930s through the 1950s, the earliest mainstream Korean idols consisted of vocal groups that sang and performed at the same time. One of the first girl groups was the Jeogori Sisters, who debuted around 1939, while one of the first boy groups to debut was the Arirang Boys. In the mid-to-late 1980s, independent music that was founded in the newly introduced genres of disco, soul, and funk began to rise in popularity. In the 1990s, the South Korean government introduced state cultural policies to promote the industrialization and internationalization of Korean pop culture. In this context, an idol-training model began developing in the South Korean entertainment industry.

== Trainee system ==
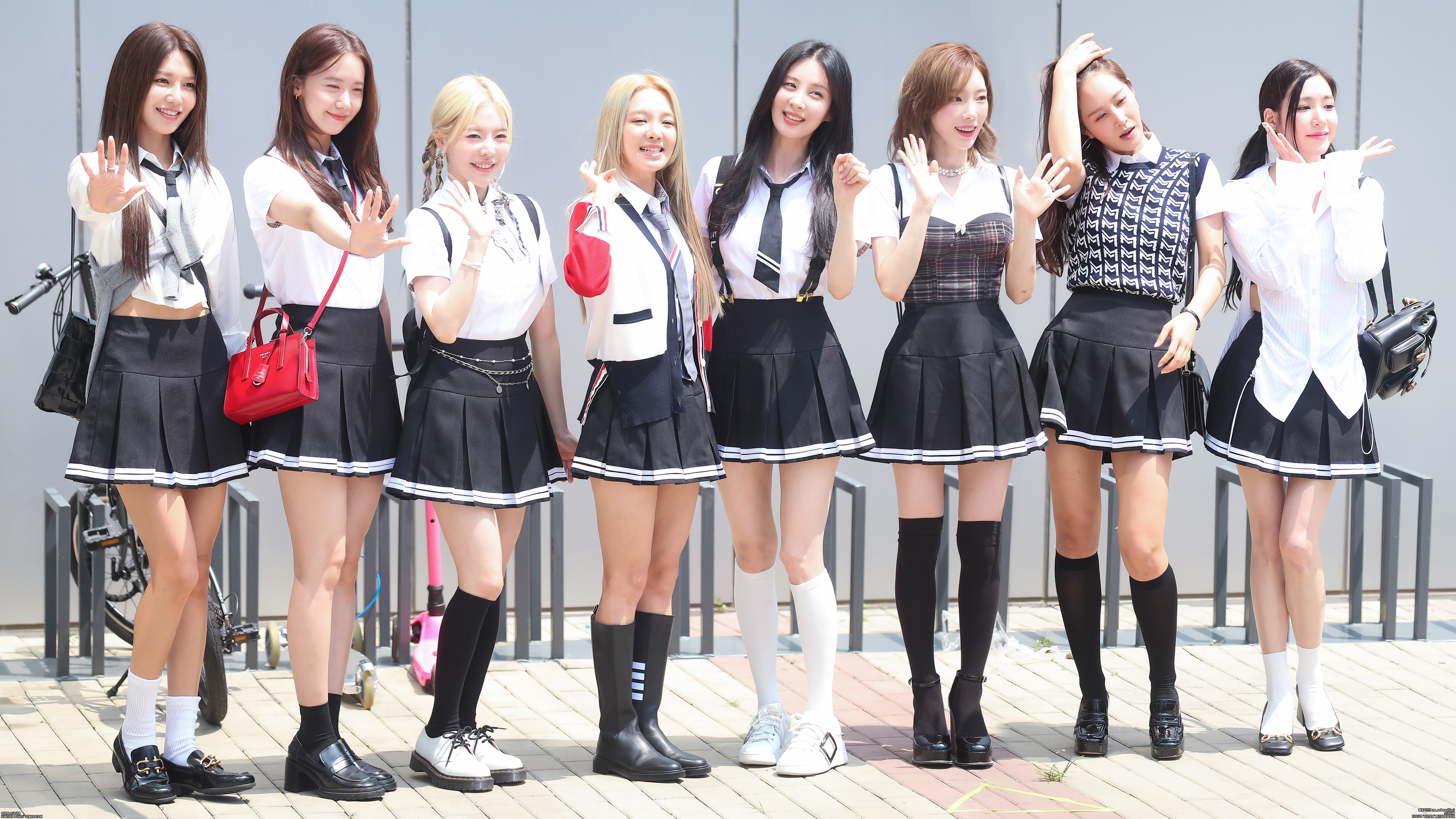
Girls' Generation, who debuted under SM Entertainment.

Inspired by the heyday of MTV in the United States, Lee Soo-man, the founder of SM Entertainment, set his sights on laying the foundation for the modern Korean pop music industry. He witnessed New Kids on the Block become very popular in Korea in the 1990s. In addition, he popularized the trainee business model from the Japanese idol industry that was founded by Johnny Kitagawa. Hundreds of candidates each day attend the global auditions held by Korean entertainment agencies to perform for the chance of becoming a trainee. This was part of a concept labeled "cultural technology."

The trainee process lasts for an indefinite period of time, ranging from months to years, and usually involves vocal, dance, and language classes taken while living together with other trainees, who sometimes attend school at the same time. However, some trainees drop out of school to focus on their careers.

Once a trainee enters the system, they are regulated in multiple aspects, including personal life, physical condition, and visual appearance. The survival, training, and regulation take precedence over natural talent in the production of Korean idols. The system requires trainees to maintain a "wholesome image" while remaining "private about their lives and thoughts".

Former trainees have reported that they were required to go through plastic surgeries, such as a blepharoplasty or a rhinoplasty, in order to adhere to the acceptable Korean beauty standards. Further criticism towards the trainee system arose regarding the companies' harsh weight restrictions, which often caused trainees to pass out from exhaustion or dehydration in an attempt to reach the required weight for their desired program.

The investment in a potential trainee could be expensive. In 2012, The Wall Street Journal reported that the cost of training one member of Girls' Generation under SM Entertainment was US$3 million.

== Personal image ==
When trainees are finally chosen to debut in new groups, they will face a new set of personalities created by the company to cater to the entertainment market. Each member of an idol group has their own character to play, and therefore an important part of their job duties is to maintain that temperament in any kind of exposure they may get. One way to build the personal image of idol groups is through social media services with content managed by the company to ensure the consistency of these personal characteristics.

== Relationship with fans ==
The relationship between Korean idols and their fans can be characterized as "parasocial kin," which means for fans to create a familial connection with their idols rather than just being "look-from-afar" fans. In some cases, within and outside of fandoms, fans also create familial connections with other fans through similar interests or just to make friends. These interactions can be initiated by the fans, the company, or the idols themselves, where they would most likely still have to go through their company to be approved.

Some projects or activities created by fans for the idols must also be approved by the venue or the idols’ company to minimize any harm to the idols and fan participants. Interactions and fan connections can be seen through events like fan meetings, also known as artist engagements, concerts or fan sites, and artist cafés. An annual event known as KCon is also a place for fans and artists to interact. The nature of this "parasocial kin" relationship can also be seen in the proactive participation of Korean idol fans in the production of idol groups. Even before debut, some trainees would already have their own fans. This leads to the "kinship" starting out early, and building that up is very important for the idol as an artist and the fan as a supporter.

Once debuted, fans grow alongside their idols and idol-fan relationships become deeper. If anything happens, fans have their own unique ways of show their attitude and opinions on issues concerning "unfair" actions of management companies. Under this situation, fans often appear to be protecting idols from company mistreatment due to the familial connection built between both sides.

Korean pop culture has made a significant impact on the world, creating numerous opportunities for fans to unite and celebrate diversity. Fans have demonstrated their commitment to K-pop idols by taking the initiative to learn the Korean language, often with the help of romanization, to comprehend the meaning behind K-pop songs and establish a connection with the artists on a personal level.

== Working conditions ==
Several Korean idol groups and solo artists have resented the contracts issued to them by their management companies, claiming that the decade-long contracts are "too long, too restrictive, and gave them almost none of the profits from their success." A director of South Korean entertainment agency DSP Media stated that the company does share profit with the performers, but often little is left over after paying costs. Korean entertainment companies such as S.M Entertainment have been called "factories" for their unique method of mass-producing stars. Members of groups are frequently retired and replaced with fresh trainees when their age or musical inclinations begin to pose a problem. TVXQ charged S.M. Entertainment for unreasonable terms in their contracts with the company in 2009.

== Expectation ==
In the Korean entertainment industry, there is a prevailing notion that idols are loyal to their fans. Due to this, many companies have implemented policies that prohibit any sort of dating. The reason for this is that reputation is crucial for idols, and any type of scandal could tarnish and ruin their image and negatively impact their careers. Fans also believe dating may be a hindrance to an idol's success.

By the constitution, military service is mandatory for all males aged between 18 and 35, requiring them to enlist for 18 months. Despite the significant contributions of Korean idols to the country's economy, there are no exceptions made for them. In the past, a former K-pop star, Yoo Seung-jun, attempted to evade military service by obtaining American citizenship. As a result, he was subsequently banned from entering South Korea.

South Korea is still a very conservative country and thus, artists who are members of the LGBT community still face significant discrimination and prejudice. Go Tae-Seob, also known as the artist Holland, debuted with his first song in 2018, “Neverland,” as a gay man. However, many citizens were not happy that he was openly expressing his sexuality. Holland brought attention to and advocated for issues surrounding LGBTQ+ rights.

== Commercialism ==
Entertainment companies in Korea use a boot-camp system in training their idols. In the case of S.M. Entertainment, the company receives 300,000 applicants in nine countries every year. They possess training facilities in the Gangnam district of Seoul, where recruits then train for years in anticipation of their debut. SM was called the first company to market "bands as brands" and commodify not just the artists' product, but the artists themselves. Such techniques have resulted in mass recognition abroad and helped to spark the Korean Wave, which benefits entertainment companies by broadening their audience.

As domestic fandom is not generally enough to produce the profits that these corporations and their players require, branding and marketing of the artist/group has become central to industry profits and, thus, a defining feature of the genre today.

== Reported earnings ==
According to the South Korean National Tax Service, the average annual earnings for a Korean idol in 2013 were KR₩46.74 million (US$42,000). This was significantly more than the 2010 figure of KR₩26.97 million (US$25,275), a rise attributable to the global spread of Hallyu in recent years. Between 2013 and 2014, not much has changed for all but the most successful handful of artists.

== Recognition ==
The Korean Wave has led to a global rise in interest in Korean idols, along with other aspects of Korean culture including Korean films and K-dramas increasing being introduced and exported to other parts of the globe. Korean idols have also influenced the rise of Korean beauty products, commonly referred to as K-beauty, due to their seemingly perfect skin.

== Accomplishments ==
Over the years, Korean idols have gained fans from all over the world, and many entertainment companies have started to promote their artists and groups internationally. Celebrities like PSY hit the top music video viewed on YouTube within 24 hours, and groups like BTS became the first foreign group to perform at the annual Grammys Award show. In 2018, Red Velvet performed in Pyongyang, North Korea, and was the first group to do so in 16 years.

There have been nineteen No. 1 albums on the all-genre Billboard 200 chart by idol groups since 2018. Stray Kids have had 9 number one albums on the chart, while BTS are closely behind with 7. Other acts who topped the Billboard 200 are Ateez, SuperM, Blackpink, Tomorrow X Together, Enhypen, NewJeans and Twice.

== Sexualization ==
There have been criticisms of the sexual objectification of female and male idols across the industry. The problem is exacerbated due to the higher rigidity of gender norms in contemporary Korean society. Korean censorship practices regarding nudity and obscenity may have further reinforced this objectification.

Korean idols also frequently wear revealing clothes and dance provocatively in music videos as part of the companies' effort to market idols in multiple ways. In some cases, these efforts have resulted in censorship; for example, "Miniskirt" by AOA was deemed sexually inappropriate to public TV shows and programs and was unable to be aired until the group modified their outfits and choreography.

This sexualization has also led to a notion of conformity in idol acceptance. Idols that do not perform in a sexually appealing way to their targeted demographic have been harassed; for example, Amber Liu has received criticism for her androgynous appearance and disregard for gender norms.

== See also ==
- Korean Wave
- Korean idols in advertising
- Fandom culture in South Korea
- Impact and popularity of K-pop
- List of South Korean girl groups
- List of South Korean idol groups
- List of South Korean boy bands
- Sasaeng fan
