= Fandom culture in South Korea =

In South Korea, fandom culture has largely formed around K-pop idols and Korean dramas. These fandoms support a large market for official and unofficial fandom memorabilia. Fan culture in South Korea emerged post-war, and has contributed to South Korea's economic growth. South Korean fan culture differs from other fandoms due to the fan's involvement with their favorite groups. K-pop fans contribute to the group's success through promotions, merchandise production, streaming, voting for awards such as MAMA (Mnet Asian Music Awards), Melon Music Awards, and Seoul Music Awards, and creating fan accounts on social media that serve as a way to promote idols and their group. This kind of heavy engagement with K-pop artists creates a fan culture that deviates from Western fan culture, developing relationships with artists that span beyond the music itself.

== K-pop fandoms ==
Fandom culture refers to the phenomenon in which people voluntarily choose a certain celebrity or genre and come together to create a specific 'acceptance' culture.

Fandom culture of Korean pop idols began in the 1970s with singers Nam Jin and Nahuna. In 1980, Cho Yong-pil appeared in the public arena, ushering in the fan girl culture. Fandoms started to become popular during the early 1980s and continued to grow rapidly into the 1990s with the emergence of Seo Taiji as a teenage idol. Fan girls gained more prominence in the press after the retirement of Seo Taiji and Boys in the late 1990s, and were described as teenaged girls who dedicated their everyday lives to following, watching, or admiring an idol star.

Around the year 2000, many fan clubs appeared and Korean youth culture became a subject of academic study. Many traditional South Koreans disapproved of enthusiastic fandoms, and early studies of the subject took a negative view.

In the earlier times, K-pop idols were pushed to act and look innocent. By banning tattoos, earrings for male idols and no risque style of dancing. This image of idols was modern enough for the Korean youth to enjoy and conservative enough to be supported by the adults.

=== History ===
Although early fandom was strongly perceived as a fan culture involving a few fanatic people, it has recently brought about a shift in perception that can be accessed in a variety of ways only by the name of a star or related search terms on portal sites, which is largely due to the development of the Internet and media.

Among the numerous fandoms in cyberspace, especially the nation's "idol" fandom has steadily expanded its influence in various ways to date, starting with "Seo Taiji and Boys." In the past, idol fandom culture was called "girl culture" or "teenage culture" and was considered primarily an immature culture for teenage girls, while the third-generation idol fandom has recently expanded to men and over 40s, exerting influence on cultural consumption aspects for all generations.

In the United States, it is argued that K-pop sensations BTS paved the way for K-pop music to become mainstream in the Western hemisphere, promoting Korean fan culture in various parts of the world. Before BTS however, the Kim Sisters were the very first Korean born group to create a reputation in the United States in 1959. Many consider the Kim Sisters to be the very first introduction to music that established the foundation for what K-pop is today.

Beginning in 2008, this era of K-pop gained international recognition with groups such as Bigbang, Super Junior, and Girls Generation. Fans conveyed their devotion to groups on social media platforms like Twitter and YouTube, participating in South Korea's fan culture by interacting with one another and developing a digital space for fans to promote new music.

=== Fan relationship ===
Parasocial relationship is a one-sided relationship as a result of constant exposure to a media persona that a celebrity demonstrates. This then causes fans to develop an illusion of intimate relationship or friendship. Kpop idols are typically trained to have and form close connections with their fans which leads for this close-knit connection to become a parasocial relationship. Kpop idols do this through parasocial interaction. Parasocial interaction between fans and Korean idol(s) is a start at explaining kpop fan culture. The idol(s) to become a "parasocial-kin", an object of consumption and parasocial interaction; such as a family member or a friend. This "parasocial kinship" is defined on how an individual would treat an extended member of the family. Allowing for further understanding of the positive and negative aspects of the idol/fan parasocial relationship.

The "Korean Wave", also known as Hallyu has become a sensational hit around the world and continues to grow every year since it began to politically take over the world in the early 2010s. While K-pop had of course existed before that, between 2011 and 2012, the government budget grew over 250% for the business. The Korean Wave played a massive role in boosting South Korea's economic affairs, and its identity served as a means for Korea to compete commercially with the rest of the world, promoting the morale of Korea in a palatable manner.

Celebrities, especially in South Korea, are icons that are driven by their presence in majorly media driven societies. As time, society, and culture progresses, the idols must change and form along with it. The best way that this is represented is through social media.

In 2015, South Korean Idols set themselves apart from many of their Western counterparts by not only joining the major social media platforms such as Instagram and Twitter, but Naver Corporation created a streaming website/app called "V Live". While Instagram and Twitter are international apps that allowed for the idols to reach their fans, V Live allowed for streaming of live (or uploaded) videos or voice only recordings. The idols can read the comments from the fans in real time and respond. As of 2022, V Live has merged with another communication platform known as Weverse, a company that allows idols to livestream from around the world, interacting with fans across the globe as well as marketing for merchandise all in the same platform.

Many K-pop idols also participate in a "Hi touch" event, even those that are widely known and popular, such as Monsta X. A "Hi Touch" is the opportunity for fans to personally meet the idols and essentially give them a high five, with the chance to say a quick word or two. The chance could be either before a concert or afterwards, sending off the idols to their next destination.

Due to the previous state of the COVID-19 pandemic affecting every part of the world, in-person concerts were impossible to attend or even create. Therefore, many K-pop groups performed online concerts, allowing fans to continue interacting with their favorite group/artist. One of the most famous K-pop conventions, known as 'KCON', hosted an online convention with over 30 artists. K-pop idols were able to interact with their fans, as fans entered contests and had the chance to have a camera stream their picture behind the performers, enabling fans to continue their support of South Korean fan culture.These are just some of the reasons that K-pop idols and their fans have a unique dynamic. K-pop fans have many opportunities to get exclusive content and interactions with the idols, creating a positive relationship for both parties.

=== Fansumer ===
"Fansumer" is a compound word of "fan" and "consumer." This means consumers who participate in production, in other words productive consumers. Then, the fan base, which was classified as a fandom, turned into a very active fan who focused on the interaction of planning, investing, and checking while participating in the overall production and production process for products or entertainers, not just one-sided love and purchase for one-sidedly.

[Table 1] Fandom vs. Fansumer
	Fandom	Fansumer
Target	Celebrity, Brand	Enterprise products, brands, and influencer.
Relationship	Yearning	Complementary and check
Role	Supporter	Partner
Core value	Support	Involvement
Ripple effect	Brand Power Up	Changes in manufacturing system processes

As shown in the table above, Fansumer's sphere of activity is very wide. As mentioned above, they invest in startup idea products, engage in corporate product development, engage in marketing activities as supporters, and support or criticize celebrities or influencer, not to mention fostering celebrities before their debut. The driving force behind these Fansumer's activities is the pride that 'it was made by me.' It's called Byme Syndrome, noting the efficacy of being created by me.

==== Fansumer activities ====
===== Subway advertisement =====
The fandom culture of posting celebrities they like or support on subway billboards along with cheering phrases is expanding. The actual number of subway advertisements is used as a measure of idol popularity. Behind the popularity of subway advertisements is the expansion of survival audition programs. As "Superstar K 6" and "Show Me the Money 3" began to gain popularity in 2014, subway advertisements supporting participants began to be posted, and Mnet's idol-building program "Produce X 101" appeared for the first time in 2016. Ads for idol and famous celebrities are expanding into a culture to communicate with celebrities rather than just a culture for fans to enjoy. In fact, many celebrities take pictures of advertisements, and fans enjoy the "pilgrimage" by bowing in front of their favorite celebrity billboards, posting post-its and taking photos.

===== Streaming of music =====
Idol fans routinely play their favorite singer's songs on various music sites. They should stream music videos and Naver TV Casts that were uploaded on YouTube. This is for the sake of high music records and music video views. It is hard to explain in a word why fans should streaming. The reasons vary. In order to show off the robustness of one's favorite idol, there are various reasons why it is difficult to define one by one, such as to show the strength of the fandom, to top music programs that reflect the number of views on music charts, to win year-end awards, to wish others to listen to the song a lot, and to let their favorite idols be disappointed if their music rankings fall.

===== Crowd funding =====
It means receiving funding from the crowd, which means that individuals, organizations and companies that need funds use the web or mobile network to raise funds from unspecified sources. It is also called social funding because it often participates through social network services (SNS).

Superstar penguin Pengsoo has started to help farmers affected by the cold weather. Pengsoo rolled up his wings to promote consumption of peaches and plums on his YouTube channel, "Giant Peng TV." Pengsoo's funding through Naver's Happy Bean Crowding Happy Bean is aimed at helping peach and plum farmers affected by the cold sea. This spring, the fruit tree was damaged by cold weather due to low temperatures during the flower season, and as the production decreased amid trees with no fruit on them, the company started to promote sales. Pengsoo was on a live show, urging consumers to buy. When Pengsoo went public, all the supplies ran out shortly after the broadcast began. Pengsoo immediately secured the second batch for his fans, but even that was sold out in less than 20 minutes.

==== The impact of Fansumer activity on many industries ====
===== Reformation of the music market =====
The phenomenon of fandom making No. 1 idol has become a form of ritual event. Once ranked first, it is exposed to the top of the music site and published in articles, which leads to other broadcasts and activities, which greatly affects popularity. To make it number one, fandom voluntarily set up a music streaming work team exclusively for music streaming labor to hold events that give prizes when they receive donations and certify streaming, or create hundreds of music site IDs to pay for music site usage rights and stream music.

Therefore, it has become difficult for singers and rookies of different genres to be on the charts compared to idols who rank first with the power of their fans. However, it was important for other singers to get popular on the charts, and there was a hoarding of music that imitated fans' streaming culture. Music hoarding refers to the act of manipulating the chart's ranking or unfairly purchasing certain music sources for the purpose of copyright revenue. After subscribing to several music platforms through thousands of smartphones and tablets, music hoarding takes place by repeatedly streaming certain music sources. As it was revealed that many singers hoarded their music, there was a controversy over whether fans' streaming labor culture should also be regarded as hoarding.

In response, Melon, the site with the highest market share among music sites, announced a plan to revamp the real-time charts. The company said it will change the standard to 24 hours on the real-time chart, which newly aggregates usage every hour. Fans, who conducted streaming labor for a time when there were not many people listening to music at dawn or during the day, complained, but in order to reduce the hoarding culture that resulted from it, the reorganization of the music charts is inevitable.

===== New business that reflects the Fansumer trend =====
The fandom will support the idol group they support. In support activities, they present gifts such as lunch boxes to idols, place advertisements on public transportation such as subways and buses, and collaborate with cafes to include phrases and images to support the idols of cup holders, or create special menu lights in cafes to hold events. As "cupholder events" began to emerge, cafes specializing in renting cupholder events for fandom activities began to emerge, reflecting this trend. Companies that used to produce and sell slogans or fans only for corporate advertising are also producing design products made from photos of idols cheered by fans, while others specialize in coffee and snack cars sent by fans to the idol's filming site.

=== Global fandoms ===
Many fandoms of K-pop are located outside of South Korea as part of a phenomenon called Hallyu 2.0, which is characterized by the extension of the Korean Wave into global markets, especially the West, and largely attributed to the development and use of Social media technologies by fans and consumers of K-pop. Due to location barriers, fans belonging to global fandoms turn to social media as a platform to consume K-Pop as well as network with other fans to organize and distribute fan activities and products such as dance cover videos, fan fiction, and group orders to purchase K-pop products.

Social media technologies such as Kpop fan sites allow international fans to form a deep emotional attachment to K-pop idols. Kpop fan sites allow fans to view idols as beautiful, talented, and approachable which leads them to be role models for international fans. This extends to the image that South Korea portrays as well. Global fans from Romania, Peru, and Brazil have been found to seek out Korean restaurants, Korean language lessons, and other fans to dance to Korean music. Creating an online and physical identity.

Online communities based around Kpop have also emerged in various spaces such as Instagram, Twitter, and Tumblr. Though the majority of the members in these online communities are non-native Korean speakers, Korean language is seen to be used among the fans. Fans have been found to play a significant role in creating fan content which may have resulted in positive and negative impact of fan and idol engagement. The geographical distance for international fans may make it hard for fans to form a connection to the idols. Though the internet has been a major role of allowing international fans to easily form a connection with their idols right at their fingertips. Global fans are found to possibly appeal to the Lacanian imaginary that Kpop-idols provide to them.

Japanese fans have been represented as an "active audience." Active audience can be defined as the fans attend the concerts often, collect information, and try to find ways to interact with idols through letters and handshake practice. Japanese females who have been exposed to the Korean Wave have been found to develop a positive idea towards Korea and the citizens by associating them to their Korean idols.

In the Philippines, fans attend the Philippine Kpop Convention, Inc. (PKCI) where they partake in activities that politically promote K-pop and Korean culture. PKCI active participation provides a key role for local fans in the Philippines to form a connection and motivation to participate in Korean culture that includes K-pop.

In Europe, K-pop idols have motivated young fans to start learning Korean language and culture. As a result, major media such as YouTube and academic institutions started to spread Korean culture. Thousands of teenage boys and girls are found buying CD's and tickets for Korean idols/musicians to join their idols in singing and dancing to their lyrics in Koreans.

==== K-pop fans & Soft Power ====
The phenomenon of the Korean Wave and the strong connection between K-pop idols and their fans resulted in South Korea to develop soft power. Soft power is the ability to shape the preferences of others through appeal. K-pop idols allow fans, globally, to view South Korea positively which results in South Korea to improve the country's ability to gain trust and preference in trade internationally transforming them into political and economic strength. After the Korean wave became more apparent, the government gave credit to the role of avid fans that contributed to the growth of Korean popular culture.

=== Political engagement and activism ===
In South Korea, K-Pop fans have engaged with politics using the skills they have developed through fandom. From late 2016 to early 2017, the political scandal involving South Korea's former President Geun-hye Park sparked a series of weekly protests called the "Candlelight Movement." Some K-Pop fans recognized how their fandom skills could also serve as protesting skills and decided to join the protests: they brought their lightsticks rather than candles, directed slogan chanting among the protesters, and even helped to guide other protesters at the events.

International K-Pop fans have also started to use their fandom skills to participate in politics, especially via social media. During the 2020 presidential election in the United States, K-Pop fans and teenage TikTok users collaborated to disrupt former President Trump's campaign rally in Tulsa, Oklahoma by reserving free tickets and then not attending the event so the seats would be empty. They used the hashtag features on TikTok and Twitter and deleted their posts after 24 hours to keep the trend away from the attention of mainstream internet users and media outlets. The Trump campaign seemed to have attained over a million ticket reservations, but on the day of the event, only around 6,200 tickets of attendees were scanned, leaving the remaining seats of the 19,000-seat capacity venue vacant.

K-Pop fans in the United States have also used their fandom-acquired social media skills to flood white supremacist hashtags like #whitelivesmatter, #whiteoutwednesday, and #BlueLivesMatter with fancams (short videos of their K-Pop idols often taken at concerts) so that internet users intending to use these hashtags could not communicate or connect through the hashtag. K-Pop fans used a similar tactic when the Dallas Police Department encouraged people to use their app "iWatch" to submit videos of "illegal activity" from the Black Lives Matter protests in 2020. K-Pop fans spammed the app with fancams to protect protestors' identities, making it difficult for the police department to sort through the posts and causing the app to experience interruptions. K-Pop fans also review-bombed the app, leaving around 3,500 negative ratings and commenting messages like "ACAB," which left the app with a one-star rating on the app store.

=== Fan behavior ===
==== Positive ====
Members of idol fandoms may better themselves in the pursuit of their obsession, such as by studying to enter the same university as their idol, learning foreign languages to follow their idol's career abroad or learning image-processing techniques to edit photos of the idol. Fandom may also lead to other interests, for example, idol group JYJ's fans like musicals because of musical appearances by Kim Junsu.

Fans role in creating their own fan content allows for idol groups to gain mainstream exposure in the west, and have tours abroad.

In addition to benefitting the idols themselves, Korean fan culture has the potential to improve fan's mental health. Fans can develop a social identity online, which allows them to interact with other fans who have the same interest in a specific group or idol and form relationships outside of the fandom itself. One's self-esteem can also be uplifted by partaking in South Korean fan culture, with other fans encouraging each other to be accepting of their own appearance.

==== Negative ====
Stalker fans, a.k.a. sasaeng fans, are considered to have become overly obsessed with a public figure and engaged in behavior that constitutes an invasion of privacy. Stalker fans may disguise themselves as a stage hand or manager to approach the star, or pretend to be reporters in order to gain entry to a press conference. Many fans use the Internet and social media to find and track the location of their idols, resulting in Korean fan culture developing a bad reputation. Sasaeng fans have gone to extreme lengths to attain a sense of closeness with their favorite idols, causing upheaval within the K-pop fandom regarding the consequences of parasocial relationships. As a result of sasaeng's presence on social media, a preconception about K-pop fans is established, with the misunderstanding that the entire fandom displays the same stalker behaviors that sasaengs do.

== Animation fandom ==
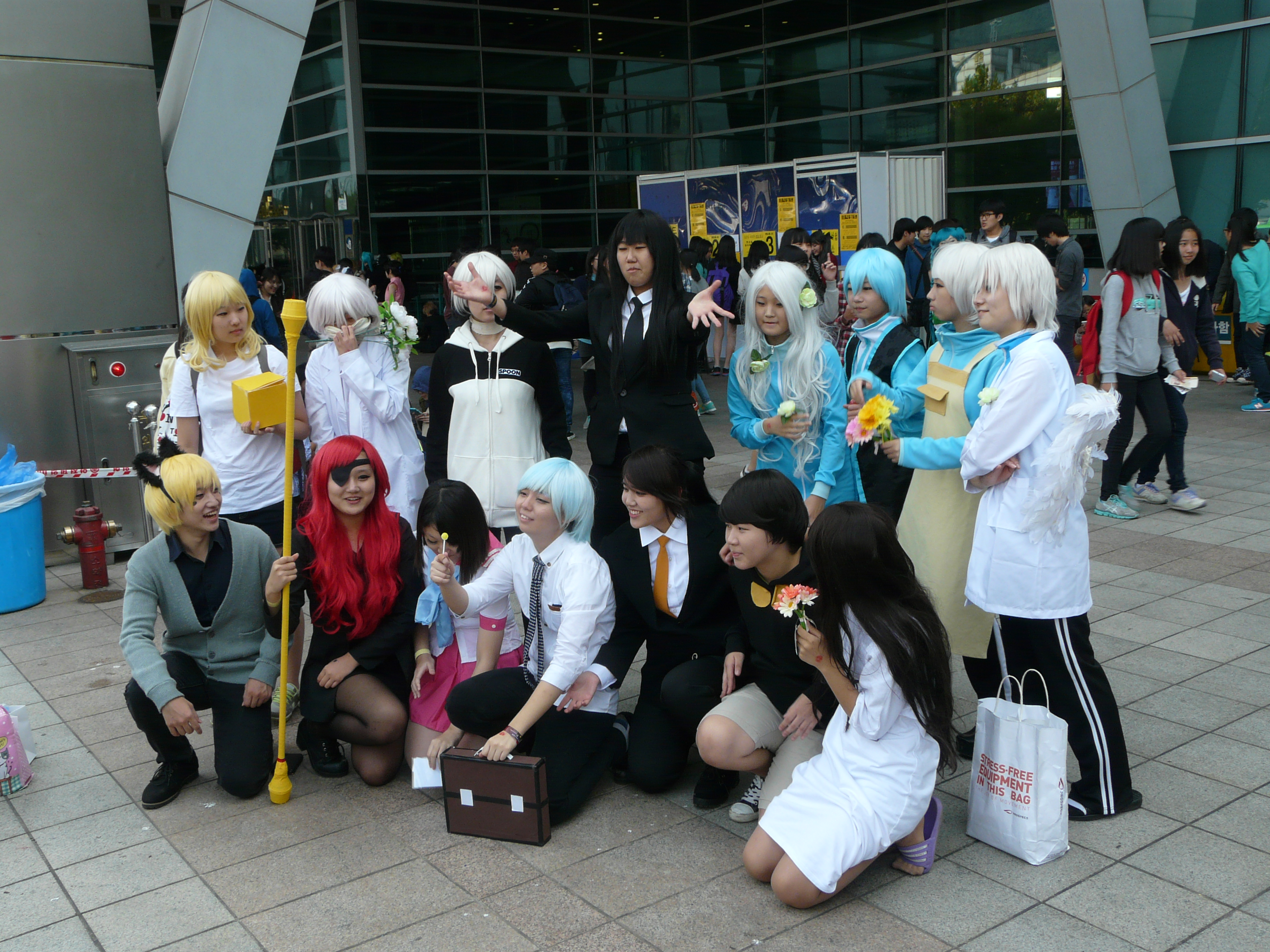
Cosplayers at Comic World Seoul, October 2013

Seoul Comic World is a large animation fandom festival and is considered to be one of the biggest anime conventions in the world. Some fans cosplay (wear costumes) as a public display of their favorite characters. Amateur artists can showcase their work, and attendees can meet voice actors and artists.

== Memorabilia ==
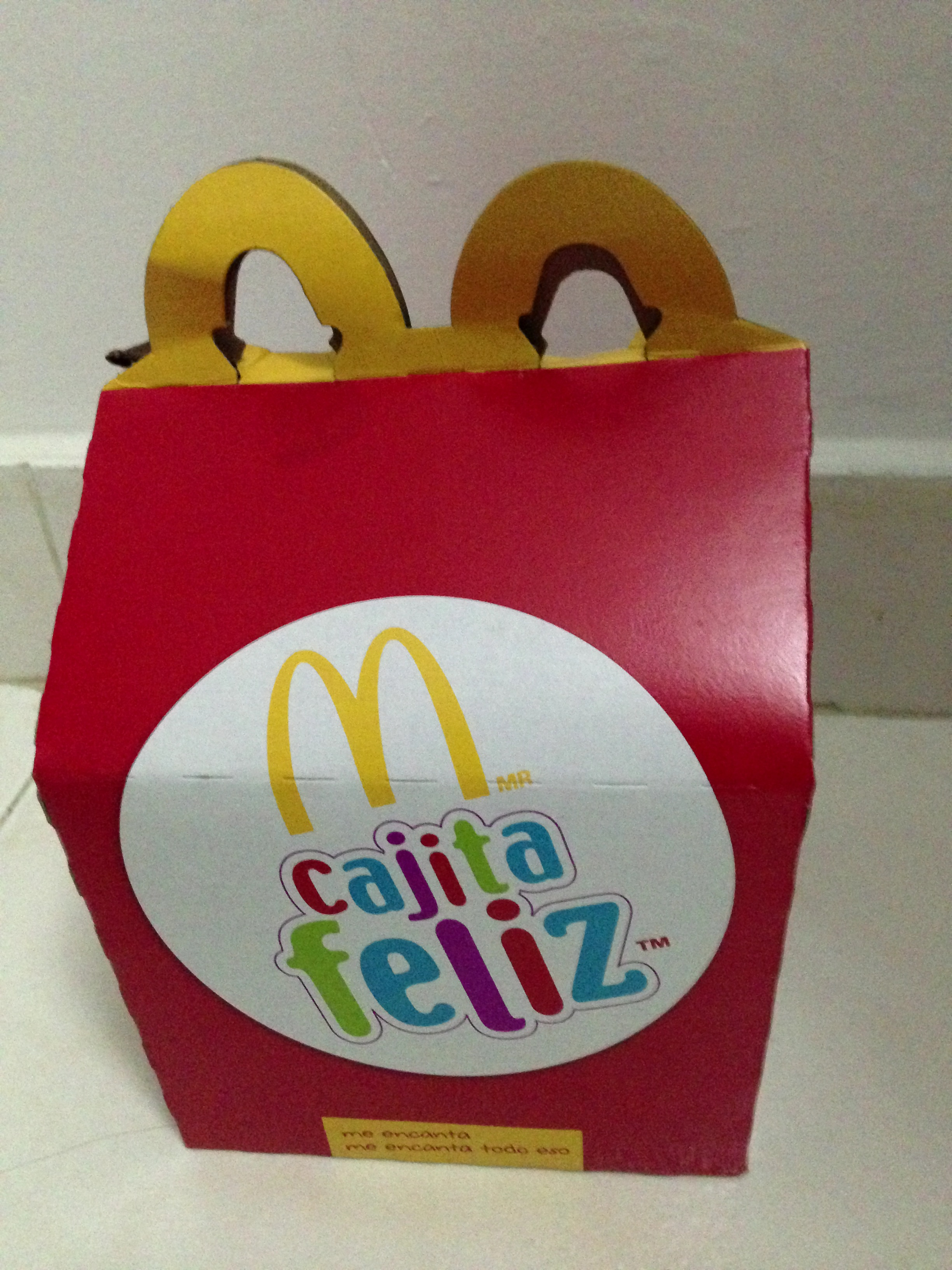
McDonald's Happy Meal as a "kidult" item

Fans collect memorabilia including idols' photographs and items marked with logos, collectively known as fan merchandise, to express their identities as fans. Fan merchandise was first produced by entertainment companies of first-generation idol groups such as H.O.T. and Sechs Kies whose fans started to buy balloons and raincoats in the group's color.

=== Sharing and selling merchandise ===
Most fan merchandise in South Korea is promoted through social media outlets like KakaoTalk and Twitter. The ability of consumers to find exactly what they want has resulted in an expansion of the market to about 100 billion South Korean won (US$89 million as of November 2017).Teenagers are the trend-setters and are often active as sellers and producers as well as consumers. Fan merchandise sells at a higher price than the nominal value of the commodity because of its sentimental value and appeal as a collectible.

In addition to the official merchandise produced and sold through entertainment companies, fans themselves produce a great deal of merchandise. In some instances, fans have responded to poor-quality official merchandise by producing their own higher-quality products, which are often cheaper. Official goods have an advantage as a commodity, while fan-produced merchandise may correspond to more specialized tastes, such as a fan-made photobook focusing on a particular member of a band. Producers and sellers of fan-made merchandise are known as "home masters".

Although it is illegal to sell products using celebrities' pictures without permission in South Korea, most entertainment media outlets do not defend the right of permission to use a likeness. Some believe that unofficial merchandise fandom cannot be regulated.

== See also ==
- Impact and popularity of K-pop
- Korean Wave
- Sasaeng fan
