= Singapore Raffles Music College =

- 新加坡莱佛士音乐学院
- SRMC logo
- Type: Tertiary Music College
- Established: 2001
- Director: Vivien Lim
- Location: 456 Alexandra Rd, #09-02 S119962, Singapore 119962; 1.2752°N 103.7991°E
- Campus: Urban
- Colours: Dark red and white
- Affiliations: University of West London
- Website: www.srmc.edu.sg

Singapore Raffles Music College (Abbreviation: SRMC; Chinese: 新加坡莱佛士音乐学院; pinyin: Xīnjiāpō Láifoshi Yīnyuè Xuéyuan) is a tertiary music institution in Singapore registered with the Council for Private Education. It was recently awarded the EduTrust Provisional award in 2014, certifying that SRMC has reached high standards in key areas of management and provision of educational services. It enrolled its first students in 2006.

The college's campus is located in north Singapore at 6A Woodlands Centre Road. It offers certificate and diploma courses in Western, Chinese and popular music. Since 2010, SRMC has partnered the University of West London to offer foundation degrees and bachelor's degrees in music.

== Academic Departments & Courses ==
SRMC has three academic faculties, offering a range of diploma and degree courses.

=== Faculty of Performance ===
- Certificate, Diploma and Advanced Diploma in Music
- Foundation Degree in Music Performance
- Bachelor's Degrees in Music (Honours): Composition, Music Performance & Recording
- Graduate Diploma in Professional Artiste

=== Faculty of Management ===
- Bachelor's Degree in Music Management (Honours)

=== Faculty of Learning ===
- IELTS Preparatory Course
- Foundation in Artiste Development

== Pedagogy ==
SRMC students choose from course electives such as Performance Skills, Music Education, Music Production, and Music Business Management to prepare for more specialized career paths.

Students study one of the following as their principal study:

- Chinese Orchestral Instruments
- Classical Guitar
- Composition
- Piano
- Vocal Studies (Classical, Pop, Folk Music)
- Western Orchestral Instruments–String, Woodwind, Brass, Percussion

Students gain performing experience with ensembles which include Chinese Ensemble, String Ensemble, Jazz Ensemble, Wind Ensemble and Fusion Ensemble. Students also take part in external performances and gigs.

Visits are made by international artistes to give masterclasses, workshops and specialist support.

== Student Achievements ==
- Zhang Chi, 2nd runner up of the 2012 Sunsilk Academy Fantasia singing competition

== Notable Faculty Members ==
- Tan Chan Boon, established Singaporean composer
- Dr Samuel Wong, PhD in ethnomusicology and Artistic Director of TENG Ensemble
- Benjamin Lim Yi, Singaporean composer and recipient of the Singapore National Arts Council Scholarship in 2013. Composer-in-residence at TENG Ensemble
- Zhu Lin, Erhu II Principal at the Singapore Chinese Orchestra
- Bevlyn Khoo, jazz-pop singer and songwriter based in Singapore
