= Beautiful Show =

2012 concert tour by Beast

- Tour by Beast
- Promotional poster for "Beautiful Show" in Seoul
- Location: Asia, Germany
- Associated album: Various
- Start date: February 4, 2012
- End date: May 27, 2012
- No. of shows: 15 in Asia; 1 in Europe; 16 in total

Beast concert chronology
- Beautiful Show (2012); We Zepp Tour 2012 (2012)

Beautiful Show is the first world tour held by South Korean boy group Beast. The world tour kicked off in Seoul on February 4, 2012, and continued on February 12, 2012, in Germany.

== History ==
On December 26, 2011, it was announced during Cube Entertainment's "Cube Entertainment Vision Briefing" press conference that Beast will embark on a 14 countries, 21-city tour, which became a 10 city tour as shows were cancelled. They kicked off the tour in Seoul for two nights, then to Berlin. Shows in England (London), Spain, America (New York, Los Angeles, San Francisco), Canada (Vancouver, Toronto), two cities in Japan, Brazil, and the Philippines were cancelled.

On January 25, 2012, it was announced through a video that Beast shared through their official YouTube account that they would be cancelling "Beautiful Show" in Brazil and the United Kingdom.

== Set list ==
1. "Special"
2. "Soom (Remix Version)"
3. "Fiction"
4. "Shock"
5. "Lights Go On Again"
6. "BEAST Is The B2ST"
7. "Mystery"
8. "Easy"
9. "Clenching A Fist Tight"
10. "Living Without You"(Jun-hyung's solo)
11. "Mother"(Yoseob's solo)
12. "When The Door Closes"(Doojoon and Dongwoon's duet)
13. "Let It Snow"(Gikwang and Hyunseung's duet)
14. "Thanks To"(Junhyung and Yoseob's duet)
15. "I Like You The Best"
16. "You"
17. "Should I Hug Or Not"
18. "Bad Girl"
19. "Freeze"
20. "Lightless"
21. "On Rainy Days"
22. "The Fact (Band Version)"
23. "Fiction"
24. "Oasis"

Encore #1

1. "Beautiful"

Encore #2

1. "VIU"

== Tour dates ==
Date	City	Country	Venue	Attendance
February 4, 2012	Seoul	South Korea	Olympic Gymnastics Arena	24,000
February 5, 2012	Seoul	South Korea	Olympic Gymnastics Arena	24,000
February 12, 2012	Berlin	Germany	Columbia Halle	3,000
February 25, 2012	Shanghai	China	Shanghai International Gymnastic Center	3,500
March 3, 2012	Singapore		The Max Pavilion, Singapore Expo	5,500
March 17, 2012	Jakarta	Indonesia	Jakarta Convention Center	4,000
March 21, 2012	Yokohama	Japan	Yokohama Arena	50,000
March 22, 2012	Yokohama	Japan	Yokohama Arena	50,000
March 24, 2012	Kobe	Japan	World Memorial Hall	50,000
March 25, 2012	Kobe	Japan	World Memorial Hall	50,000
March 26, 2012	Nagoya	Japan	Nippon Gaishi Hall	50,000
March 27, 2012	Nagoya	Japan	Nippon Gaishi Hall	50,000
March 31, 2012	Taipei	Taiwan	National Taiwan University Sports Center	—
April 1, 2012	Taipei	Taiwan	National Taiwan University Sports Center	—
May 26, 2012	Bangkok	Thailand	Impact Exhibition Hall 1	—
May 27, 2012	Bangkok	Thailand	Impact Exhibition Hall 1	—
Total				N/A
