= K-pop Cover Dance Festival =

K-pop dance competition

K-pop Cover Dance Festival (Korean: K팝 커버댄스 페스티벌) is an international amateur dance competition, organised with the support of the South Korean television network MBC. The contestants perform dance covers of K-pop songs, i.e. imitate choreography performed by K-pop artists.

== Selection ==
In order to participate, all competitors must film their dance routines on video and submit the videos online. All videos go through an online selection process, and the best contenders earn the right to compete live in local selection contests in their respective countries. The winners of the local rounds are invited to South Korea, where the final round takes place.

== Popularity ==
In 2011, over 1,700 contenders from 64 countries submitted their dance videos. 66 contestants were selected to go to South Korea to participate in the final.

== Competition ==
| Year | Prize | Nation | Team | Show | Artist | Ref. |
|---|---|---|---|---|---|---|
| 2011 | 1 | Russian Federation | Febris Erotica | "Shock" | Beast | |
| 2011 | 2 | Japan | KOTORIP | "I Am the Best" | 2NE1 | |
| 2011 | 3 | Thailand | Next School | "Bang!" | After School | |
| 2012 | 1 | Thailand | Lollipop CZ | "Fantastic Baby" | BigBang | |
| 2012 | 2 | Japan | にゃいにぃ | "Juliette" | Shinee | |
| 2012 | 3 | Nigeria | Elevatorz | "Again & Again" | 2PM | |
| 2013 | 1 | Thailand | Millennium Boy | "Growl" | Exo | |
| 2013 | 2 | Japan | Afro Girls | "Bar Bar Bar" | Crayon Pop | |
| 2013 | 3 | South Korea | First One | "Can't Nobody" | 2NE1 | |
| 2014 | 1 | Japan | QieeN | "Pitapat" | Bestie | |
| 2014 | 2 | Thailand | STATION5 | "A" | Got7 | |
| 2014 | Popularity Award | Hong Kong | MS.ECHO | "Flashback" | After School | |
| 2015 | 1 | Thailand | DEFVALEN | "Bad" | Infinite | |
| 2015 | 2 | Japan | QieeN | "Only You" | Miss A | |
| 2015 | 3 | Philippines | CYPHER | "Shake It" | Sistar | |
