= Advertising in South Korea =

South Korea's advertising industry is a growing multibillion-dollar industry with aims to increase consumer spending. The method of advertising most companies primarily used based on the amount spent is television, followed by newspaper ads. With the rapidly increasing number of internet users across generations, companies are also branching out and spending more for internet ads. In fact, internet advertising revenue generated 12.2% of the gross revenue from the Korean advertising industry, which is 6 times the amount from 2001. Although growth seems to be continuous, significant decreases or low levels of spending on advertisement is seen during the recovery and development stages after the Korean War, and the Asian Financial Crisis of 1997.

== Similarities and differences ==
Some western influence can be found in Korean advertising through the usage of the English language, whether it is written or spoken English, or a product represented by an American celebrity. One prime example of this is a commercial Jessica Alba did with Lee Hyori for the product Ǐsa Knox. Despite some Western integration within Korean advertising, Korean ads are also distinctively different from Western cultures. Like a number of other Asian countries, Korea is a collectivist society while Western nations such as the U.S. are an individualist society. This disparity makes the usage of competitive comparative advertising more prevalent in countries such as the U.S. while Korea does not actively engage in such methods. Comparative advertising has been illegal in Korea up until 2001. Koreans view this kind of method of promoting their business arrogant and pushy and tend to stick with more indirect messages where the meaning of the ad must be inferred. Throughout time, ads have changes from collectivist to a more individualist approach among Korean ads due to shifts in cultural values.

== Trends ==
The advertisements in 70's and 80's are more direct than recent advertisements. In the ads in 70's and 80's, the name of the product was on the ads and pictures of it took up a significantly bigger portion of the ad. The words formed full sentences and were clearly direct. Overtime, sentences became not as clear and direct and instead the usages of ellipsis became more prevalent. In more recent ads, the name and the products do not take up significant portions of the ads. Instead, there are logos, jingles and hints that represent the product. To attract people to buy the product, ads pose questions and suggestions, and the models are tell the consumer how the product affected them and recommend buyers to try it. The ads attract peoples' attention by creating a similarity or relationship between the models and the buyers by giving advice and by attempting to solve the everyday consumer problems.

=== Change in gender roles ===
Traditionally Korean women served under the ideals from Neo-Confucianism. Television ads of products for women in Korea on average portray the female figure as dependent and submissive. However, in more recent times, companies are now using white models for ads in their magazines geared towards the younger generation. Ads are depicting women who are in the working force and have more freedom from their traditional values in older Korean society. The reflection of the change in advertising is tending to reshape the stereotype of Asian women and lean more towards Western culture. Indeed, Korean society has become lenient, independent, and individualist from their strong conservative and collectivist nature.

=== Celebrity advertisement ===
Koreans are known for their extensive use of celebrity advertising. Celebrities are often viewed as symbols of the culture and due to their distinctive qualities, celebrities are believed to exert special influence on the public. As cultural symbols, celebrities are used in advertising to connect with consumers and draw their attention to the endorsed brand. Much of Korean advertising, from clothes to food, are endorsed by celebrities.
