= Madonna fandom =

Aspect of Madonna's career

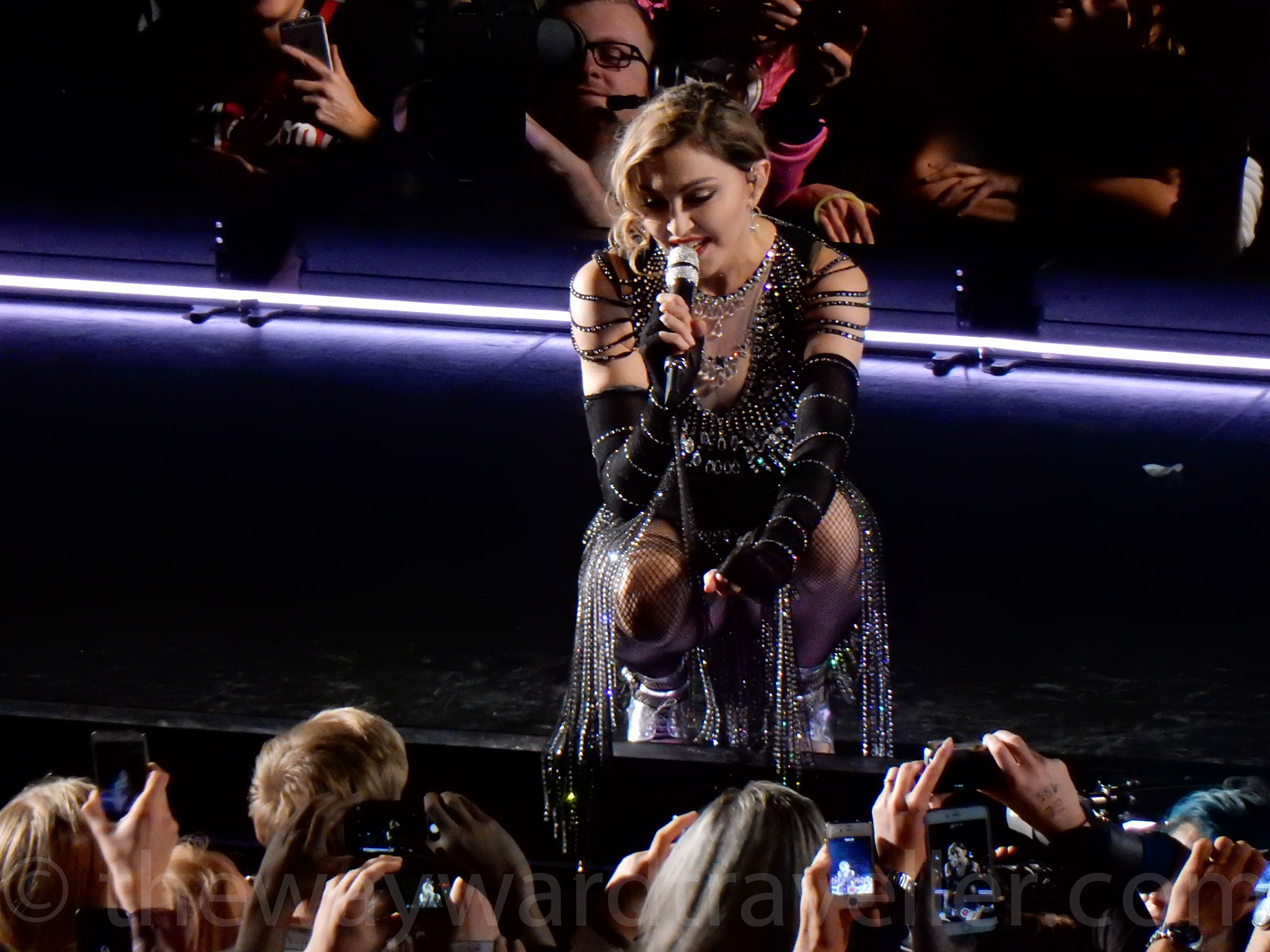
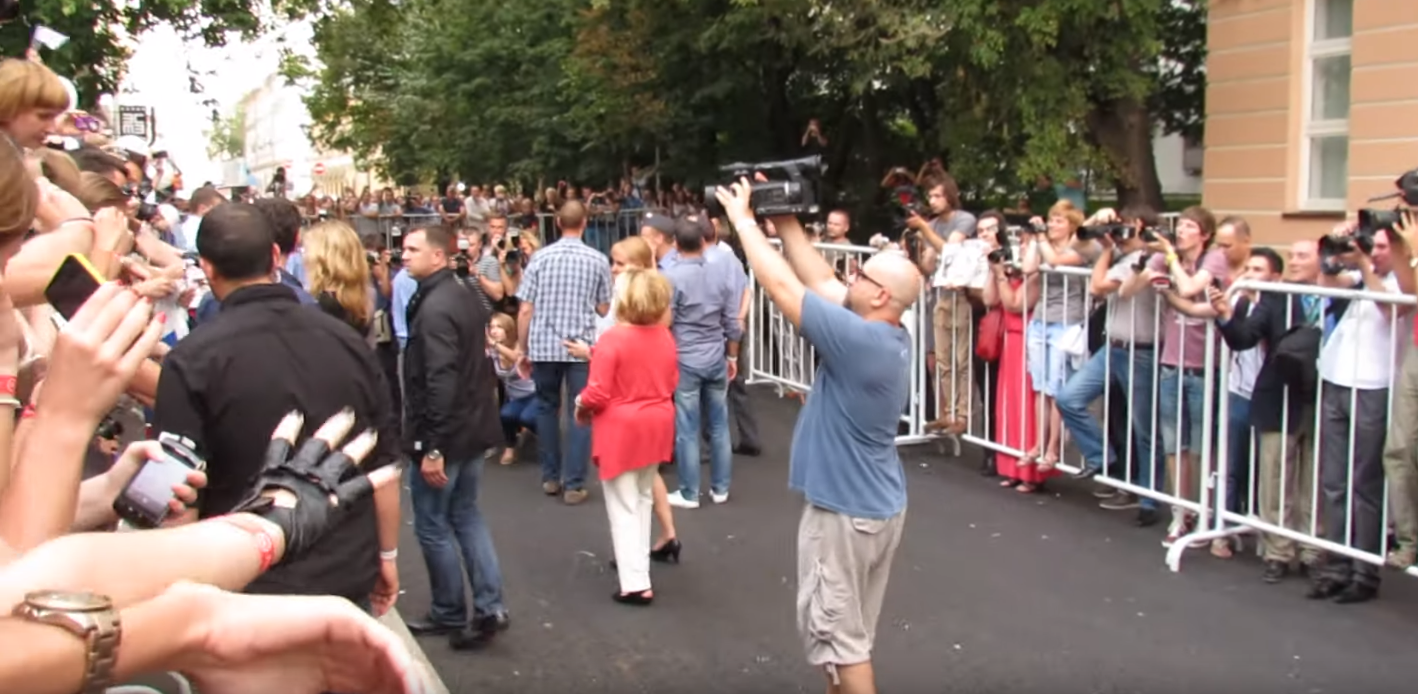
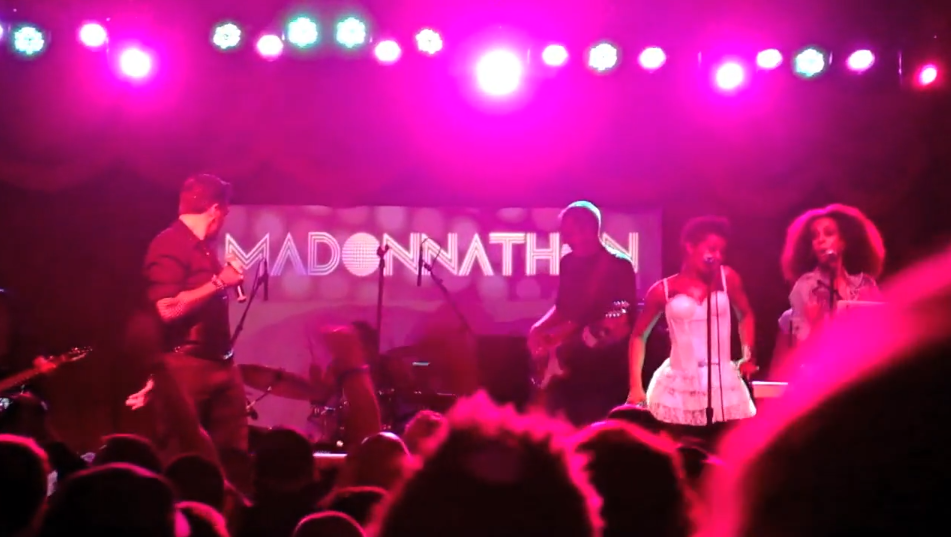
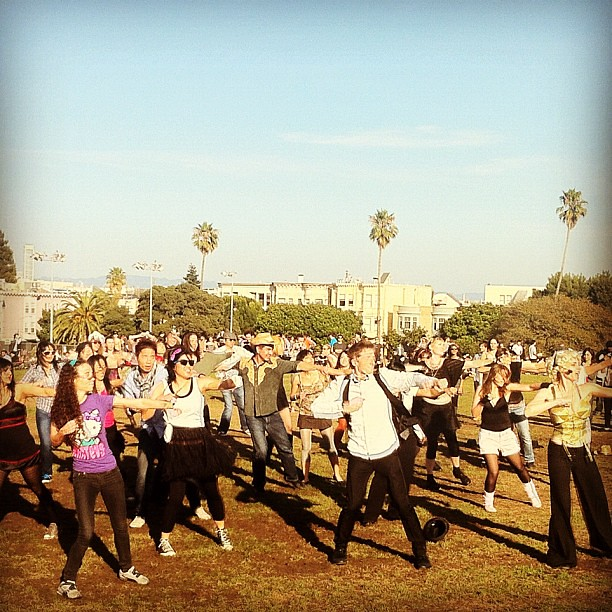
Top: Madonna interacting with fans and audience. Bottom: fan-led activities and events.

Madonna fandom refers to the fan community of American singer-songwriter Madonna (born 1958). Unlike some other fandoms, her fan base does not have an official moniker, although "Madonna wannabe" became a popular media label to talk about her early audience, which consisted mainly of teenage girls. Lisa Lewis stated that Madonna was "one of the first women to attract the kind of devotion of young female fans normally associated with male rock stars".

Throughout her career, incidents, fan activities, as well as anti-fan responses including dedicated groups and websites, have received media attention. Madonna's fandom has also been the subject of scholarly research, from studies of her early audience to analyses of her online communities. Some individuals identified as fans or admirers have also stalked Madonna or made threats against her, while some public figures have expressed admiration for her, including Mexican painter Alberto Gironella, whose later works were dedicated to or inspired by the singer. She became a subject of fan collecting, topping Record Collector's "100 Most Collectable Divas" list in 2008.

Madonna's influence on audiences, particularly among teenage girls during the height of her career, became the subject of significant attention and criticism. In addition, Madonna has been cited in works by authors such as Amos Oz (How to Cure a Fanatic, 2004), Michael Gellert (The Fate of America: An Inquiry Into National Character, 2001), and Classical Mythology (et al., 2007), in discussions of broader forms of fanaticism.

== Fandom ==
=== Origins and Madonnamania ===
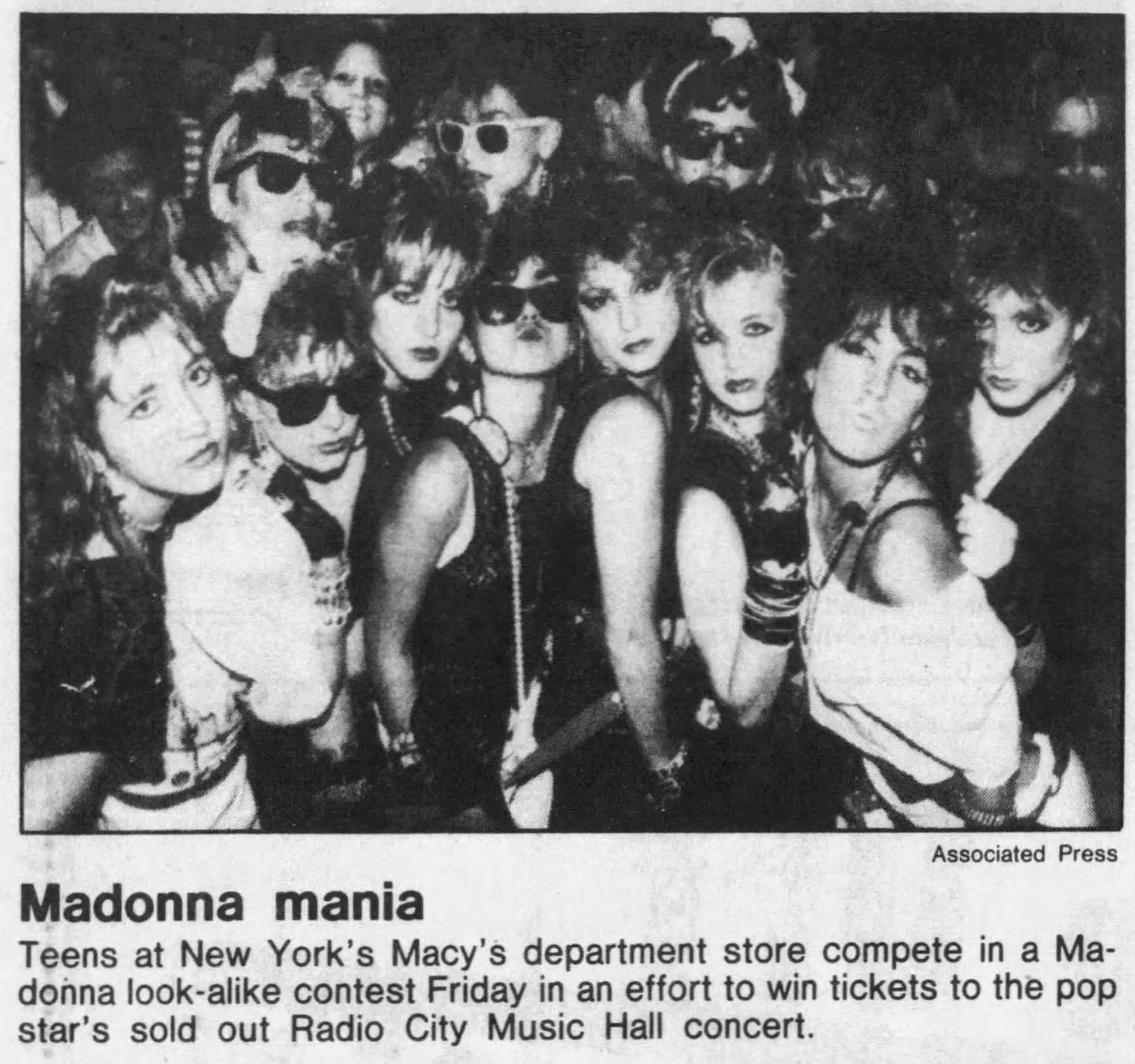
Madonna mania, as reported by Associated Press in 1985

Madonna released her debut album, Madonna, in 1982 and her second studio album, Like a Virgin, in 1984. In 1985, Madonnamania had spread internationally. Music & Media (1985) reported its spread across Europe and Lucy O'Brien (Madonna: Like an Icon, 2007) described the phenomenon as having spread "from city to city" across the United States. Following the launch of her first international concert tour, the Who's That Girl World Tour (1987), authors and publications including Russell Baker and Billboard reported widespread fan enthusiasm in the United Kingdom, while similar reactions were reported in Japan, coinciding with Madonna's Japanese television debut, a commercial for Mitsubishi. Japanese newspapers described the reception as the "Madonna Fever" or "Madonna Fee-ba". Although the initial craze declined, media outlets continued to use the term Madonnamania to describe the renewed public interest surrounding her later projects, including the 1991 documentary Truth or Dare, fast-selling ticket sales for tours such as Girlie Show (1993), and her performance debut in Russia (2006) and Colombia (2012).

=== Demographics and nickname ===
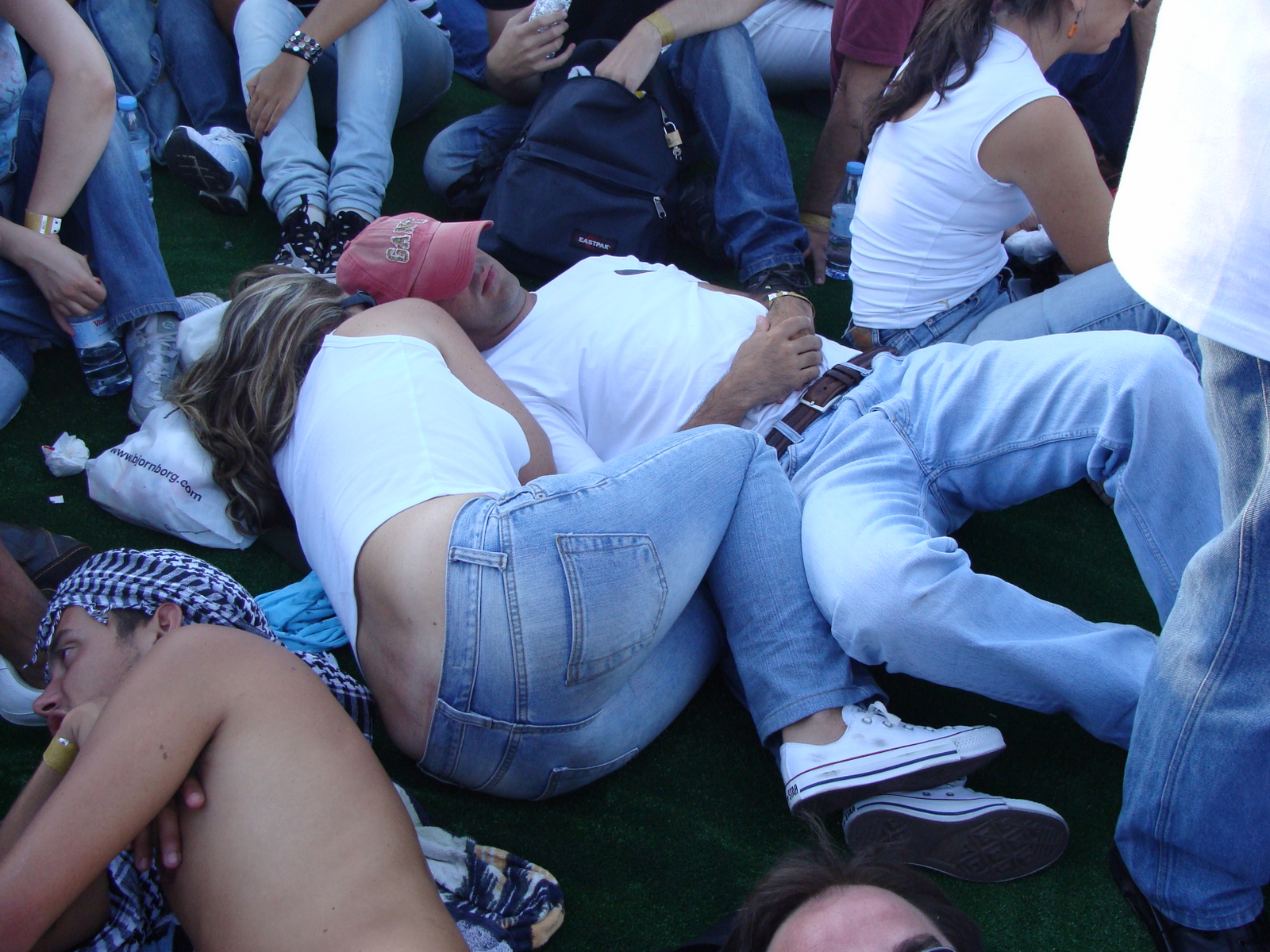
Portuguese concertgoers waiting for Madonna's Sticky & Sweet Tour concert in 2008

French academic Georges-Claude Guilbert stated that Madonna's early audience consisted mainly of teenage girls before gradually expanding into a broader public. By the mid-1980s, Madonna developed a "natural fan base" among young women, gays, and blacks according to author Andrew Morton in Madonna (2001). In 2009, based on data from social media networks, AtData estimated that her fans were predominantly female.

In 1995, Gail Dines and Jean M. Humez stated: "Understanding Madonna's popularity also requires focus on audiences, not just as individuals but as members of specific groups". Tracy L. Tuten (2010) similarly emphasized this, and professor Sheila Jeffreys (2005) noted that she achieved cult status among different audiences. American academic James Lull (2000) stated that she appealed to multiple fan groups, and described her audience as diverse, including young and older people, heterosexual and gay fans, and individuals from different educational backgrounds. In 2007, music critic Joey Guerra of Houston Chronicle, referred to "five most common types" of her fans, including what he calls "The Madonna Complex", a group of "thinkers" with interest in Madonna.

Author Judith Buddenbaum (2009) noted that Madonna sold out multiple concerts throughout her touring career, while biographer Mary Cross similarly attributed this success to her strong fan base. During an interview with NME in December 1995, Madonna stated: "I've gone from having a huge fan base to losing a huge fan base to having a kind of fluctuating fan base. I've always had a core of fans who've stuck by me but, depending on the kind of music I do, I end up appealing to certain groups of people and alienating others".

"Madonna wannabe" became a popular media label for her fans early in her career, particularly her youth audience, according to Annalee Newitz in 1993. Her fan base, however, has generally been reported to lack a collective nickname. In 2017, Pier Dominguez of BuzzFeed News suggested that some members of her online fandom called themselves "Iconers", a name derived from Icon, Madonna's official fan club. In Madonnaland (2016), author Alina Simone wrote that her fans "aren't necessarily cuddly" and lack a "cute name". Jason Richards of The Atlantic (2012) wrote that Madonna's fans simply call themselves "fans".

=== Media and fan activities ===
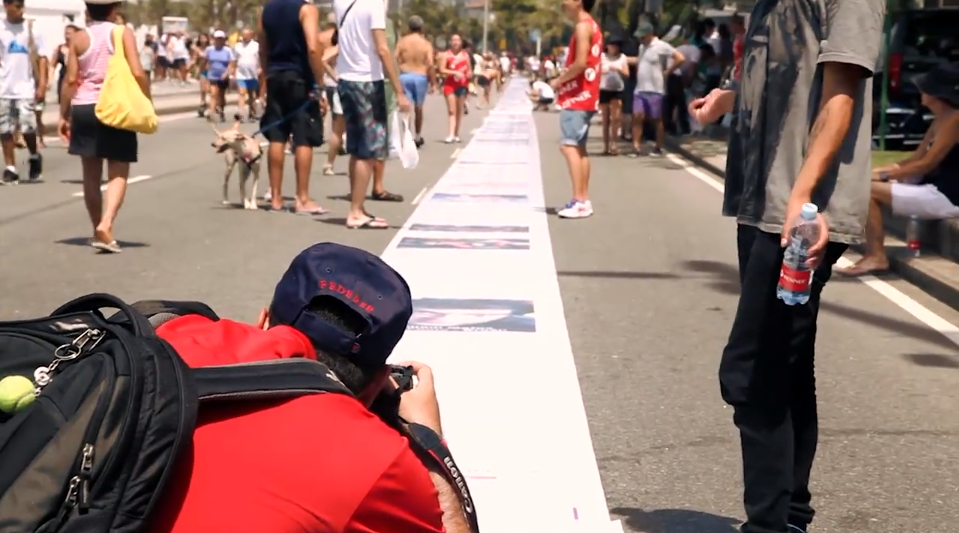
The fan letter created by Madonna's Brazilian fans and Lojas Renner in 2012.

A high-profile contest organized by Macy's in 1985 to promote Madonnaland, a clothing line inspired by the Madonna wannabe style, featured Andy Warhol, Madonna's stylist Maripol, MTV personality Nina Blackwood, and Madonna: Lucky Star author Michael McKenzie as judges. In 2012, Lojas Renner, together with some of Madonna's Brazilian fans, created what was described as the world's largest fan letter, a one-kilometre-long message across Ipanema, according to a press release. Simone wrote that one investment fund is dedicated significantly to her, Marquee Capital, and they had contributed to exhibitions of Madonna memorabilia, including a 2014 auction collaboration with Julien's Auctions.

Media outlets have documented fan activities such as flashmobs, conventions, and themed parties. Examples include a 2011 flash mob in San Francisco, the U.S.-based Madonnathon (1992–1993) with international attendees, and a separate tribute event of the same name launched in 2003 and described by BroadwayWorld in 2018 as "the largest Madonna tribute show and dance party in the world".

Fan activism was also reported in media. This included a petition signed by 3,300 fans called "End the Madonna U.S. Radio Boycott" on petitionline.com reacting to low chart performance in the U.S. of the singles from the Confessions on a Dance Floor (2005), as well as conspiracy theories about why Madonna was not played on the radio. Bedtime Stories (1994), became the subject of a fan-led social media campaign amid the COVID-19 pandemic, promoted with hashtag #JusticeForBedtimeStories, with Madonna expressing her gratitude to her fans and for helping the album reach the number one on iTunes charts. In 2018, French fashion photographer Vincent Flouret, also a fan, recreated many of Madonna's looks with his Golden retriever. The earnings from the photo session, called Maxdonna, were destined to Madonna's charity Raising Malawi.

=== Fan media and visual depictions ===
According to Matthew Rettenmund, Like a Fanzine (1990) was the first and only fanzine authorized by Madonna. Independent fanzines also emerged, including MLC (1987). The Inside the Groove — Madonna's Music podcast was described by PinkNews in 2023 as the most-listened Madonna podcast and reported by Elle to have reached 50,000 downloads by 2020. Material Pipol (2009), produced by Madonna's official Chilean fan club (MadonnaChile), received media coverage, including a front-page feature in La Cuarta. Madonna.com promoted Like a Prayer (2019), a fan-led documentary by Oxana Nabokova from Russia.

Authors of Representing Gender in Cultures (2004) noted that "hundreds of webpages and newsgroups" devoted exclusively to Madonna. Among these, Madonnalicious.com, founded in 2001, received the People's Choice Award for Best Music Website/Unofficial Site at the 2004 BT Digital Music Awards. Madonna's official website was recognized in the General Website: Celebrity/Fan category at the 2016 Webby Awards, and was previously nominated on the 2000 My VH1 Music Awards.

=== Fans and Madonna's interaction ===
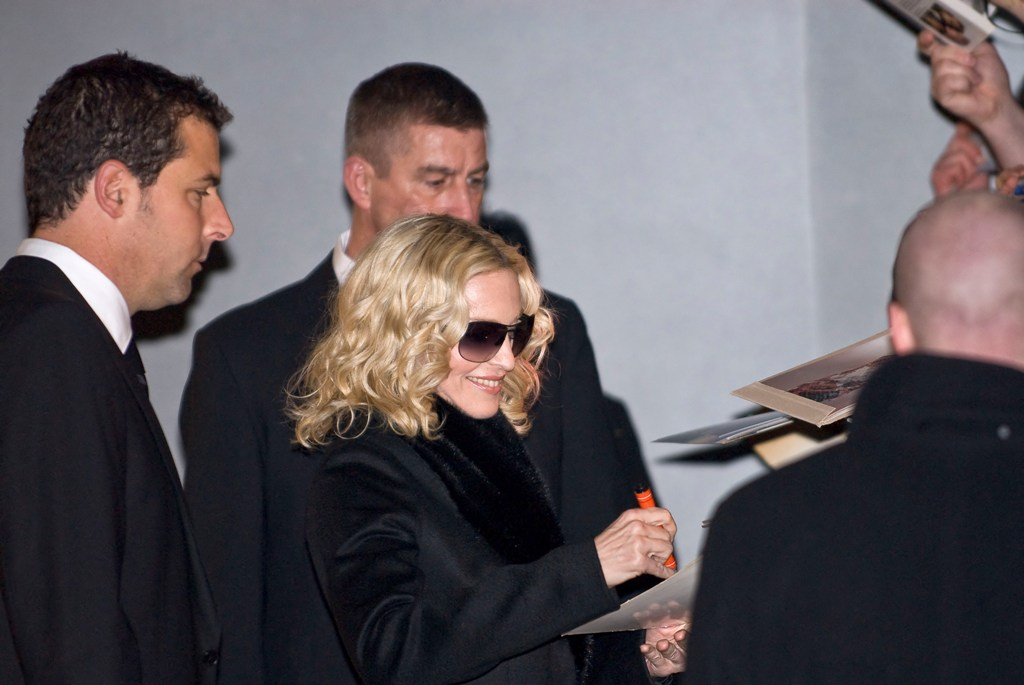
Madonna signing autographs to her fans in 2008

Madonna occasionally interacted with audiences and fans. Madonna's official fan club is called Icon, and international fan clubs dedicated to her also exist. A 1994 hand-written letter from Madonna to her fans was published in her fanzine Icon (vol 4, issue 4, n. 16). Madonna engaged with audiences through online platforms, including Reddit's r/IAmA in 2013, where fans had the opportunity to ask her questions, and during the promotion of her studio album Rebel Heart, she chatted with selected fans on Grindr, and took part in an interactive chat for AskAnythingChat for Romeo Saturday Night Online.

The songs on the compilations Celebration (2009) were selected by Madonna and her fans, and the cut "Broken" was given to Icon's official members as a free 12" vinyl. The one-time show, Madonna: Tears of a Clown (2016) was given as a special concert to her Australia fans, due long-lack Madonna performance of her previous tours. Tickets were free, but made available to only members of her official fan club, Icon, and were non-transferable. In 2017, Madonna discussed the idea of smaller-scale shows and being able to talk directly to the audience.

Some public figures have also expressed admiration for her, including Mexican painter Alberto Gironella, who dedicated or drew inspiration from her in his later works. BBC journalist John Hand noted in 2001 that "It's becoming increasingly common for Madonna fans to achieve mini-celebrity status themselves". He was later described by the Australian newspaper The Age in 2002 as Madonna-phile due to his interest in the singer. According to BBC journalist Emily Mackay (2018), Madonna has been the subject of dedicated fan collections. She topped Record Collector's 100 Most Collectable Divas in 2008.

==== Hacking and Stalking incidents ====
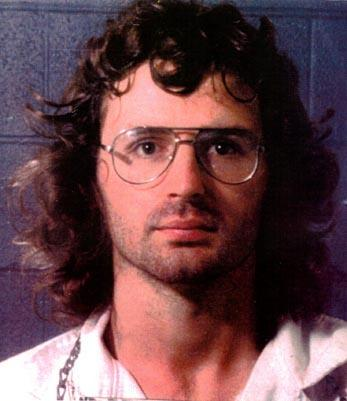
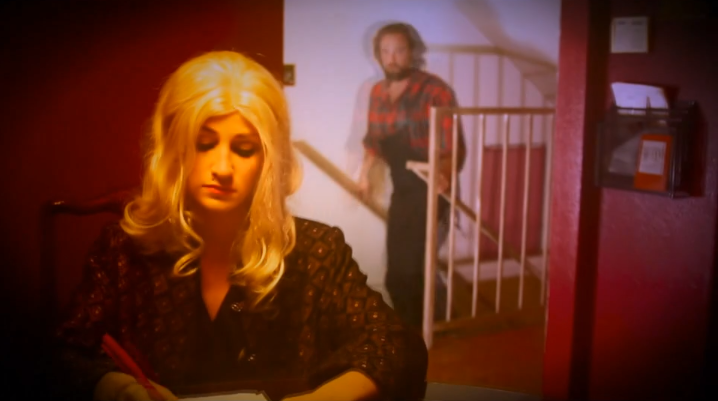
From left to right: Cult leader David Koresh and a scene from LUV for Keeps: The Story of Madonna's Stalker (2012), based on Robert Dewey Hoskins.

Through her career, Madonna experienced death threats from obsessed fans and house-break ins by stalkers. Examples include Todd Lawrence in 1994. During 1995 and 1996, Robert Dewey Hoskins, scaled the wall outside singer's Hollywood Hills estate. Hoskins, who threatened to kill Madonna, was condemned to 10 years in jail in 1996. Madonna appeared in court to testify. In 2012, professor of forensic psychology Katherine Ramsland discussed his case and concluded that "Madonna's obsessive fan reflects our celebrity-centered culture". In 1993, media reported David Koresh was obsessed with Madonna and sometimes wanted to kill her. Through the 2000s and 2010s, similar situations and cases were reported by media.

Madonna was also affected by fan hackers. In 2011, the "Madonnaleaks" conducted to arrest a Spaniard fan, after illegally leaking the demo of her song "Give Me All Your Luvin'". In 2015, after an international investigation assisted by the FBI, Adi Lederman from Israel was jailed for 14 months in Tel Aviv for hacking Madonna's computer and leaking her album Rebel Heart.

=== Scholarly and media analyses ===
Early in her career, Madonna's fans were the subject of scholarly research. Authors of The Madonna Connection (1993) noted that media scholars interested in her fans interviewed them to "reconstruct what meanings viewers derive from Madonna concerts, records, videos, magazine articles, and so forth". In 1995, professors Gail Dines and Jean M. Humez observed that "the most visible and most scrutinized Madonna fans [were] the wannabes' adolescent white girls". Lisa Lewis wrote in 1990 that Madonna "was one of the first women to attract the kind of devotion of young female fans normally associated with male rock stars".

Later in Madonna career, Frances Wasserlein devoted her research to her online fandom in Madonna: Bawdy and Soul (1997) by Canadian professor Karlene Faith. She described her fans, as an "interestingly international lot" that have put "literally billions of bytes on web sites all over the world". In Media and Memory (2011), scholar Joanne Garde-Hansen also explored her online fandom, commenting that the "archiving, commemoration and remembering of her has already begun".

== Public perceptions ==
=== Background ===
Madonna has been the subject of controversy and criticism throughout her career. The release of her book Sex (1992) became one of the major controversies of her career, and according to scholar Karlene Faith (1997), resulted in the loss of many of her older and feminist fans. Samantha Thrift commented for Third Space in 2003 that "Madonna has inspired a love/hate relationship with many of her audiences". Mark Bego (2000) and Time's Belinda Luscombe (2023) similarly defined her as someone who represents different things to different people. Bego additionally commented that the mere mention of her name "conjures strong reactions".

Media outlets such as The New Zealand Herald (2016) noted anti-fan content ranging from websites and social media groups to publications dedicated to Madonna. In 2009, The Guardian journalist Priya Elan ranked Madonna among the top ten Google searches for the phrase "I hate...", which returned 276,000 results. John Marrs, also writing for the same publication, noted the existence of Madonna Blows Chunks (created in 2003), and described it as the largest anti-Madonna website. Madonna also inspired the publication of books critical of her image or popularity such as the I Hate Madonna Jokebook (1993) and I Hate Madonna Handbook (1994).

=== Criticisms and discussions ===
==== Young audiences ====
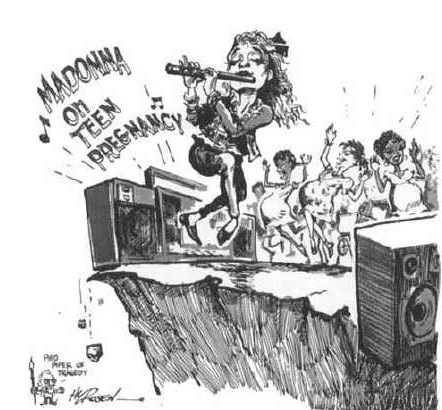
Madonna was criticized following the release of "Papa Don't Preach" (1986), with some critics arguing that the song glamorized teenage pregnancy.

According to Thrift, Madonna faced criticism over her influence on teenage fans, with parents, religious groups, and neoconservatives labeling her a "corrupter of youth". Author Donald C. Miller (2018) argued that she shaped the fashion, identities, desires and life goals of a substantial number of teenage girls. American journalist Vanessa Grigoriadis wrote for The New York Times (2019) that with the release of "Papa Don't Preach" in 1986, Madonna attracted "a lot of criticism about corrupting young female fans souls or encouraging teenage pregnancy".

Scholar Cornel Sandvoss (2007) explained that her young girl fans were deemed by critics "as one of the most disempowered groups in society". Some critics portrayed them as "cultural doped", able to be manipulated at will and against their own interest by the "moguls of the cultural industry", and such manipulation "would be not only economic, but also ideological", according to biographer Adam Sexton (1993).

American historian Gil Troy explained that she was accused of fostering a generation of "sluts", as her teenage female fans "adopted" her messages. Sexton wrote that for her critics there is no shortage of evidence to support this view: "Madonna's videos exploit the sexuality of her face and body. Thus, all this would suggest that 'she is teaching her young female fans to see themselves as men would see them'". In The Madonna Connection (1993), the authors wrote that "the popular press has reported" concerns among Madonna fans themselves, quoting women in their early twenties who said: "We think it's bad for all these little kids to admire her. Did you see her movie [Desperately Seeking Susan]? She was a slut, she smoked". The authors expressed, "little wonder that they often were positioned as a passive audience or that there was a moral panic about the effects that Madonna was having on them".

More broadly, the Parents Music Resource Center (PMRC) included Madonna among the high-profile artists it criticized as part of a campaign for increased parental controls over recorded music. At a 1985 US Senate hearing, PMRC representatives advocated for warning labels on recordings containing explicit content. The campaign contributed to the introduction of voluntary warning labels by the recording industry, which later evolved into the Parental Advisory label.

==== Madonna's influence and fandom culture ====
Throughout Madonna's career, her influence and the behavior of her audiences remained subjects of discussion and criticism. In the view of historian and journalist Garry Wills in Certain Trumpets: The Nature of Leadership (2013): "Madonna fans have not acted on the subversive values scholars find in their idol. Her audiences were notably well behaved, with little evidence of the alcohol and drug abuse found at other rock stars' concerts". Glenn Ward (2010), however, observed that for some critics she represents "a typical product of cynical media manipulation" and that her "millions of fans" were characterized as "brain-dead" by critics, while Peter Gardella (2016) said that Madonna articulated her own understanding of sin through explorations of sexuality and religious themes, influencing others in the process.

More broadly, Madonna was also cited by authors discussing phenomena such as celebrity worship and fandom culture. In 2009, Terry Moran of the ABC News included Madonna among contemporary examples of idols in the U.S. from a Christian scriptural perspective. Michael Gellert, in The Fate of America: An Inquiry Into National Character (2001), explored American identity through its history as well as celebrity culture arguing that celebrities such as Madonna, Michael Jackson, Sylvester Stallone and Arnold Schwarzenegger are viewed as "demigods", while he criticized adulation. In How to Cure a Fanatic (2004), author Amos Oz cited Madonna and Maradona as examples of universal idolization, while the authors of Classical Mythology (2007), in their discussion of idolization, wrote referring to her: "The furor aroused by the female singer Madonna or the rock group The Beatles devastates both men and women equally, sometimes enhanced by the Dionysiac use of intoxicating drugs". American writer Jennifer Egan described herself as having never been particularly interested in Madonna, and commented in 2002 on the singer's devoted following:

Madonna is a narcissist — and so are her fans, including those who hate her the most. This is what Nell Bernstein meant when he wrote, "Madonnaism is ultimately less about the star than about the fan. The idea is not simply to look at Madonna, but also to look at yourself looking at Madonna." So it is with all celebrity worship. It's no accident that Madonna's first and most rabid fan base consisted of teenage girls at an age when total self-involvement is a basic condition of life. They were wild to play their part, mimicking her dance moves and clogging up their arms with rubber bracelets. For the rest of us, it was easier to point the finger and say Madonna started it.

=== Controversies, incidents and lawsuits ===
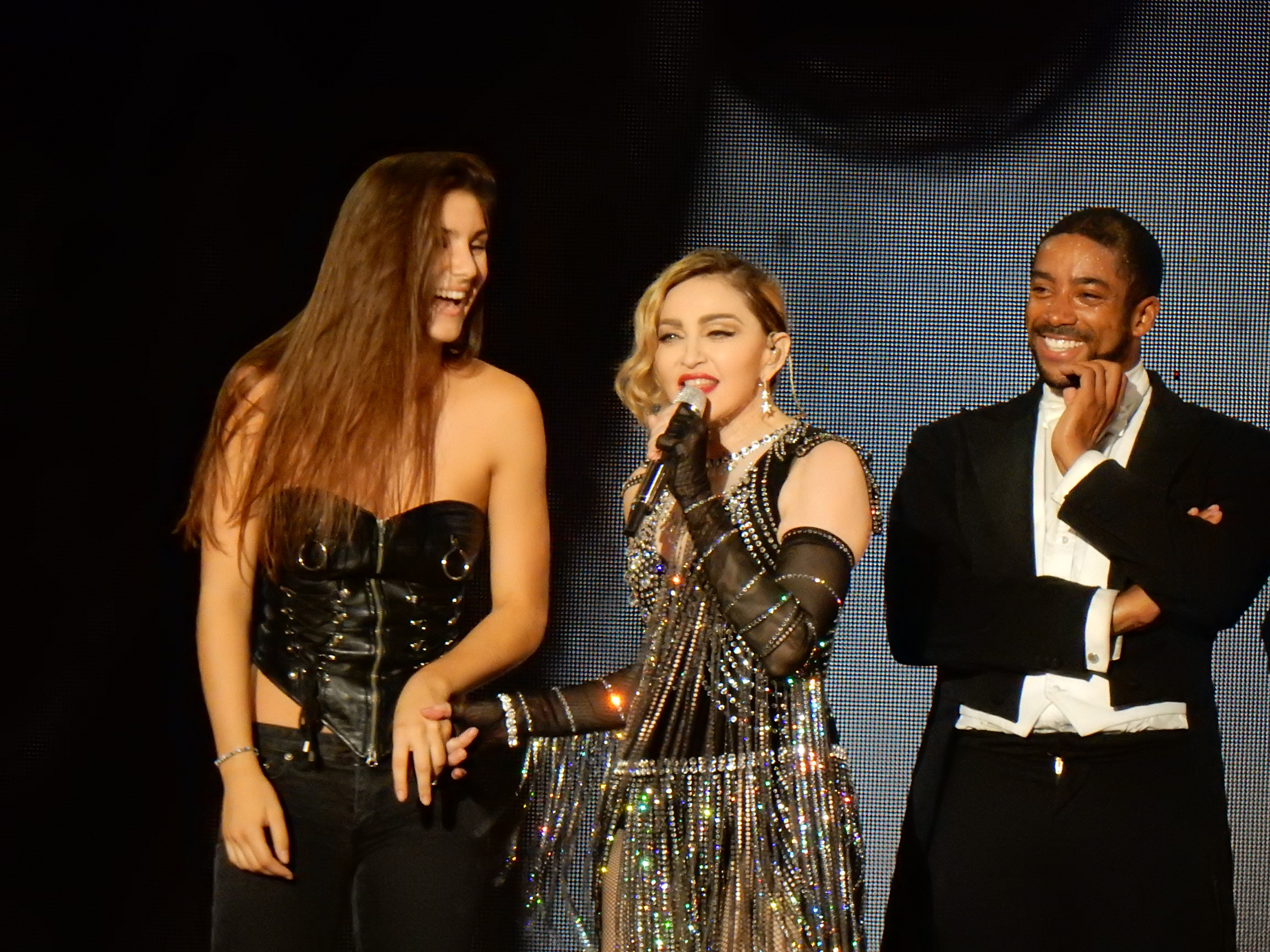
Madonna with 17-year-old Australian fan Josephine Georgiou in the Rebel Heart Tour (2016).

Incidents involving Madonna and her fans have also been reported by media. In 1988, fan Marvin Markowitz sued Madonna over injuries he claimed to have suffered during her 1987 Who's That Girl World Tour concert at Anaheim Stadium. The lawsuit said that Madonna encouraged the crowd to move closer to the stage, causing thousands of fans to rush forward and crush him. During the Rebel Heart Tour in 2016, Madonna invited 17-year-old Australian fan Josephine Georgiou onstage and briefly exposed her breast while interacting with her. The incident received media attention and criticism, although Georgiou stated that she was not offended and did not intend to pursue legal action. During the Celebration Tour (2023–2024), Madonna called out a fan in a wheelchair for remaining seated during a performance before apologizing after realizing the situation. According to media reports, the fan was not offended, although the incident prompted criticism on social media.

Madonna received criticism from various fans for starting concerts late or shortening performances on several tours. Some of these complaints led to legal actions, including one class-action filed by approximately 3,000 attendees of her 2012 MDNA Tour in Chile, a concertgoer in Miami during the Madame X Tour (2019–2020), and in the Celebration Tour (2023–2024). The Minnesota Star Tribune journalist Joe Bream included Madonna in a 2024 article about high-profile performers known for frequent lateness, writing that Lauryn Hill "battles Madonna for the queen of tardiness".

Madonna faced criticism from fans over high ticket prices for some of her tours, including the Re-Invention Tour in 2004, Madame X Tour (2019-2020) and the Celebration Tour (2023-2024). In The Guardian (2023), Nancy Jo Sales discussed concerns expressed by fans about Madonna's "bizarre" behavior on social media, which Sales suggested may be connected to her self-marketing nature.

== See also ==
- Madonna impersonator
- Madonna as a gay icon

== Book sources ==
- Bego, Mark (2000). Madonna: Blonde Ambition. Cooper Square Press. ISBN 0815410514.
- Buddenbaum, Judith M. (2009). Religious Scandals. ABC-CLIO. ISBN 978-0-313-34689-7.
- Cowen, Tyler (2000). What Price Fame?. Harvard University Press. ISBN 0674001559.
- Cross, Mary (2007). Madonna: A Biography. Greenwood Publishing Group. ISBN 978-0-313-33811-3.
- Faith, Karlene; Wasserlein, Frances (1997). Madonna, Bawdy & Soul. University of Toronto Press. ISBN 0-802-04208-2.
- Gardella, Peter (2016). Innocent Ecstasy, Updated Edition: How Christianity Gave America an Ethic of Sexual Pleasure. Oxford University Press. ISBN 978-0190609412.
- Gellert, Michael (2001). The Fate of America: An Inquiry Into National Character. Brassey's. ISBN 978-1-574-88471-5.
- Guilbert, Georges-Claude (2015). Madonna as Postmodern Myth. McFarland. ISBN 978-0-786-48071-5.
- Jeffreys, Sheila (2005). Beauty and Misogyny: Harmful Cultural Practices in the West. Routledge. ISBN 1134264437.
- Lull, James (2000). Media, communication, culture: A global approach. Columbia University Press. ISBN 978-02-3112-073-9.
- Miller, Donald C. (2018). Coming of Age in Popular Culture: Teenagers, Adolescence, and the Art of Growing Up. ABC-CLIO. ISBN 978-1440840616.
- Morford, Mark P. O.; Lenardon, Robert J. (2007). Classical Mythology (PDF). Oxford University Press. ISBN 978-0-195-30804-4.
- Morton, Andrew (2001). Madonna. Macmillan Publishers. ISBN 0-312-98310-7.
- O'Brien, Lucy (2007). Madonna: Like an Icon. Bantam Press. ISBN 978-0-593-05547-2.
- Oleksy, Elżbieta H.; Rydzewska, Joanna (2004). Representing Gender in Cultures. Peter Lang. ISBN 0-820-46546-1.
- Oz, Amos (2015). How to Cure a Fanatic. Random House. ISBN 978-1784700690.
- Parish, James Robert (1995). Today's Black Hollywood. Pinnacle Books. ISBN 0786001046.
- Schwichtenberg, Ramona Liera; Pribram, Deidre; Tetzlaff, Dave; Scott, Ron (1993). The Madonna Connection. Westview Press. ISBN 0-813-31396-1.
- Simone, Alina (2016). Madonnaland. University of Texas Press. ISBN 978-0-292-75946-6.
- Troy, Gil; Cannato, Vincent J. (2009). Living in the Eighties. Oxford University Press. ISBN 978-0190293239.
- Tuten, Tracy L. (2010). Enterprise 2.0: The behavioral enterprise. ABC-CLIO. ISBN 978-0-313-37240-7.
- Ward, Glenn (2010). Understand Postmodernism: Teach Yourself. John Murray Press. ISBN 978-1444133981.
- Wills, Garry (2013). Certain Trumpets: The Nature of Leadership. Simon and Schuster. ISBN 978-1439127308.
