= Kpop4planet =

Online climate activist group

- Established: March 3, 2021; 5 years ago
- Founders: Lee Dayeon; Nurul Sarifah
- Purpose: Reduction of the environmental impact of the K-pop industry
- Staff: 10 (2024)
- Website: https://www.kpop4planet.com/

Kpop4planet (K4P) is a climate activist group composed of K-pop fans. It was founded in 2021 by Lee Dayeon and Nurul Sarifah, who were inspired by other fan activism initiatives by K-pop fans. It participates in hashtag activism to place pressure on music companies, as well as companies that partner with K-pop artists, to reduce their environmental impact. Its petitions have received tens of thousands of signatures.

Kpop4planet's first campaign convinced the e-commerce company Tokopedia to commit to 100% renewable energy by 2030. Its "No K-pop on a Dead Planet" and "Plastic Album Sins" campaigns criticized music companies for incentivizing bulk purchasing of albums, which results in plastic waste. Its "High Fashion, High Carbon" campaign criticized the carbon emissions of fashion houses. The group collaborated with Korea Beyond Coal to protest the creation of a coal plant near a beach used for a BTS album cover. In 2023, the group successfully campaigned for Hyundai Motor Company to terminate a deal with Adaro Energy to receive aluminum created with coal power. Its campaign to reduce the carbon emissions of music streaming led to Melon committing to 100% renewable energy by 2030.

== History ==
=== Background and establishment ===
Fan activism by fans of Korean popular culture began in the 1960s. K-pop fans often conduct internet activism, with some initiatives involving thousands of fans. K-pop fans supporting the Black Lives Matter movement raised 1 million U.S. dollars for the Black Lives Matter Global Network Foundation in 2020. Earlier examples of environmental activism within the fandom include a hashtag campaign by Indonesian K-pop fans opposing a Korean company's deforestation in Papua Province, fundraising by fans of Seventeen to restore forests in Gangwon Province destroyed by wildfires, donations to victims of natural disasters, and campaigns to plant trees.

Lee Dayeon, a fan of Aespa from Daegu, and Nurul Sarifah, a fan of Exo from Jakarta, founded Kpop4planet in 2021. The two met on an online youth environmental group. Upon realizing there was no K-pop fan activism group about climate action, they chose to create one, inspired by the Black Lives Matter activism by K-pop fans.

The organizers created a Twitter account ahead of the group's official launch in order to analyze its content strategy. The website launched on World Wildlife Day (3 March) 2021, ahead of the United Nations climate panel COP26. It highlighted climate efforts by K-pop artists such as Blackpink, which was a brand ambassador of COP26, and Red Velvet, which worked on a United Nations clean air initiative. The group's Korean branch was organized by Kim Na-yeon, a fan of NCT Dream. The group formed an organizing team with four members to run its social media accounts.

=== Campaigns ===
K4P's first campaign was #Tokopedia4Bumi, which urged the Indonesian e-commerce company Tokopedia to use 100% renewable energy by 2030. The company was chosen because it worked with artists such as BTS and Blackpink as brand ambassadors. The group aimed to receive 2,030 signatures on its petition, which it achieved by October 2021. The effort led Tokopedia to create a plan to use renewable energy.

An early issue targeted by K4P was the practice of releasing versions of CDs with sweepstake entries or collectible photo cards, which encouraged bulk purchasing of albums and generated plastic waste. According to Lee, K4P chose to deal with the issue as K-pop fans were widely aware of it. The "No K-pop on a Dead Planet" involved mailing 8,000 unused copies of albums to the companies that produced them. Lee considered the campaign a victory as some entertainment companies began reporting on their environmental impacts or changing their products. The group has labelled the switch to recyclable materials for CDs as greenwashing as companies did not change the marketing model. It has proposed a model called the "green album option", which would give buyers the choice to pay for more albums than they receive.

Kpop4planet joined with Korea Beyond Coal to oppose the construction of a coal power plant near Maengbang Beach in 2021. The beach was popular among K-pop fans as the site of an album cover by BTS. Their joint position opposing the plant received thousands of signatures, but construction continued.

In 2022, Hyundai Motor Company entered a memorandum of understanding with the Indonesian company Adaro Energy to purchase aluminum from Kalimantan Industrial Park. Despite Hyundai and the Indonesian government describing the industrial park as low-carbon, Adaro planned to construct coal power plants to power it until 2030. K4P launched a petition against Hyundai in March 2023. As Hyundai worked with BTS as its brand ambassadors, the campaign spoke to Indonesian fans of the band. The petition got over 11,000 signatures and Hyundai held two meetings with K4P. The same month, the company announced its termination of the deal, though it did not explain the reason.

Lee initially considered CD waste to be the group's most important issue but learned that music streaming can lead to more carbon emissions with increased listening, especially with the K-pop practice of streaming parties, in which fans listen to an album on repeat to increase listening statistics. The group called on streaming companies to switch to 100% renewable energy. The campaign gained attention after a comic by Lee explaining the issue went viral on Twitter. It held a dance demonstration in Seoul in February 2023 to urge the streaming platform Melon to use 100% renewable energy by 2030, to which the company agreed.

K4P launched its "High Fashion, High Carbon" campaign during Paris Fashion Week 2023. The campaign targeted the fashion houses Celine, Chanel, Dior, and Yves Saint Laurent, which all had members of Blackpink as brand ambassadors, for increasing their carbon emissions in 2021. This campaign involved trucks playing videos with environmentalist slogans in front of the brands' Seoul offices and worldwide landmarks. Lee was included in the BBC 100 Women list for 2023. K4P staged a September 2024 protest, "Plastic Album Sins", at the headquarters of the entertainment company Hybe in Seoul. It opposed the model that encourages bulk buying, which the group had identified in a survey as the company's "worst business practice".

== Methods ==
Kpop4planet has 10 full-time members, as of 2024. Its petitions have been supported by over 50,000 people from hundreds of countries. It targets people in the millennial and Gen Z generations, the demographics with the most K-pop fans. It is active on several social media websites and conducts hashtag activism; it is most active on Twitter, which has a large presence of K-pop fans. It held nine campaigns by 2024, targeting music companies as well as other companies that are connected the industry.
