= Anime music video =

Fan-made music video consisting of anime clips set to an audio track

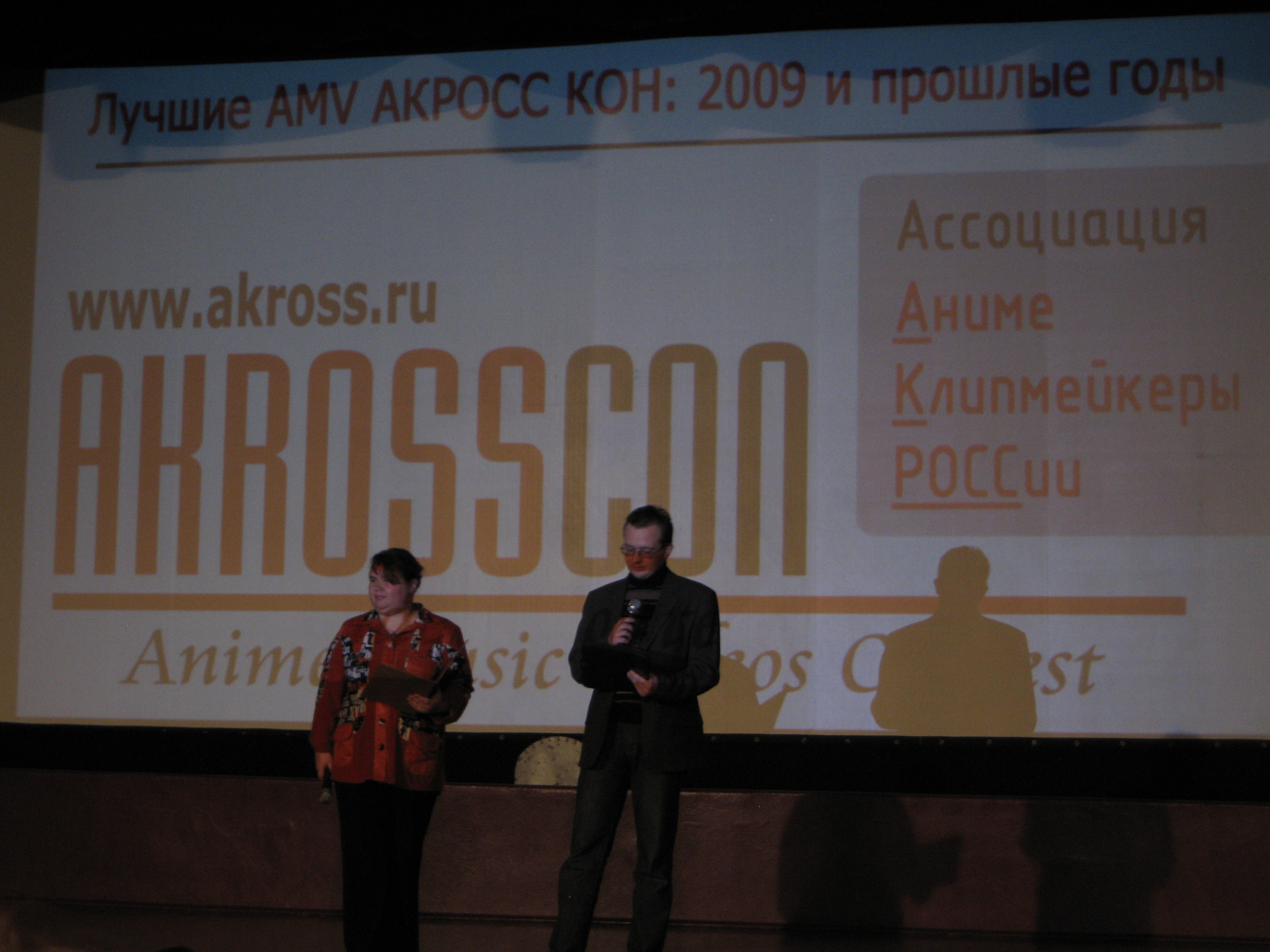
AKROSS Con Screening (2009)

An anime music video or an Animation Music Video (AMV) is a fan-made music video consisting of clips from one or more (usually Japanese) animated shows or movies set to an audio track, often songs or promotional trailer audio for the main purpose of passing on a story, emotions, or express a particular artistic vision. The term is generally specific to Japanese anime, however, it can occasionally include footage from other mediums, such as American animation, live action, or video games. AMVs are not official music videos released by the musicians, they are fan compositions which synchronize edited video clips with an audio track. AMVs are most commonly posted and distributed over the Internet through AnimeMusicVideos.org, video downloads and YouTube. Anime conventions frequently run AMV contests who usually show the finalists/winner's AMVs.

AMVs should not be confused with music videos that employ original, professionally made animation (such as numerous music videos for songs by Daft Punk and Gorillaz, or Linkin Park’s song “Breaking the Habit” which was animated by Gonzo) or with such short music video films (such as Japanese duo Chage and Aska's song "On Your Mark" that was produced by the film company Studio Ghibli). AMVs should also not be confused with fan-made "general animation" videos using non-Japanese animated video sources like American animation, or with the practice of vidding in American media fandom, which evolved convergently and has a distinct history and fan culture. Parallels can be drawn between AMVs and songvids, animated fan-made videos using footage from movies, television series, or other sources.

== History ==
The first known anime music video was created in 1982 by 21-year-old Jim Kaposztas. Kaposztas hooked up two videocassette recorders to each other and edited the most violent scenes from Star Blazers to "All You Need Is Love" by the Beatles to produce a humorous effect.

During the era of analogue tape distribution, fansubbing groups would often add AMVs to the end of tapes in order to fill space that could not fit a full episode. These early AMVs would often serve as a means of advertising anime films and series to Western audiences.

During the 1990s, AMVs became a part of the anime convention scene. While initially used to fill dead air during convention programming, the popularity of AMV viewings led to the eventual inclusion of formal AMV shows and contests.

Between 1999 and 2001, the availability of digital consumer video capture technology saw a shift from VCR-based editing to digital editing. During this time, participation in anime conventions as well as the AMV scene grew rapidly. By the early 2000s, AMVs had become established as a significant part of anime fan culture.

== Creation ==
The creation of an AMV centers on using various video editing styles to create a feeling of synchronization and unity. Some examples include:

- Raw Editing: Using basic zooming in and out "effects" along with simple transitions.
- FX (Effects) Editing: This style consists of large amounts of visual effects. This can be accomplished in programs such as Sony Vegas or Adobe After Effects.
- Timing Editing: The editor edits the clips such that the anime footage is in sync with the lyrics or beats (from the song) to create a perfect harmony. (E.g. Matching beats to gunshot scenes or making an anime character's lips move to make it seem like the character is saying or singing those words in the AMV)
- Flow Editing: This requires the editor to use transitions and to keep the AMV flowing as opposed to have it consist of rough cuts and choppy parts.
- Animation Editing: Although it sounds similar to the term AMV editing, it is a new style where editors take a still image and animate it (making it move) (This also applies to Manga Music Videos (MMVs) which are similar to AMVs, instead they use manga as the main source of footage).
- Masking: This style requires the editor to remove the background from the anime scene they would like to add effects to. It is a painstaking and time-consuming process.
- 3D: This style consist of using a built-in camera from the video editing software. Usually involves 3D texts or 3D anime characters.
- MMV: This style is mostly using manga as opposed to anime, with animation and compositing combined.
- HMV: This subgenre uses hentai clips instead, hence the name hentai music video. Unlike other AMVs, they are posted exclusively on pornography sites, due to explicit sexual content on the source clips which prevented them from being uploaded on most video sites.
- GMV: This style consists of footage from video games, hence the name game music video. Usually using gameplay footage and/or in-game cutscenes.

== Popularity ==
John Oppliger of AnimeNation has noted that fan-produced AMVs are popular mostly with Western fans but not with Japanese fans. One reason he cited was that Western fans experience a "more purely" visual experience in as much as most Western fans cannot understand the Japanese language, the original language of most anime, and as a result "the visuals make a greater impact" on the senses. The second reason he cited was that Westerners are "encouraged by social pressure to grow out of cartoons and comics during the onset of adolescence" whereas Japanese natives grow up with animation "as a constant companion"; as a result, English-speaking fans tend to utilize and reconstruct existing anime to create AMVs whereas Japanese fans "are more intuitively inclined" to create or expand on existing manga and anime.

== Legal issues ==
Japanese culture is generally permissive with regard to the appropriation of ideas. Works such as dōjinshi, unauthorized comics continuing the story of an official comic series, are actually encouraged by many anime makers. These dōjinshi take an original copyrighted work and expand upon the story, allowing the characters to continue on after, before, or during the original story. Most anime producers encourage this practice, as it expands their series. Some see it as a tribute while others see it from a business viewpoint that it draws in more support for the anime than it would have had otherwise. Some manga artists create their own dōjinshi, such as Maki Murakami's "circle" Crocodile Ave (Gravitation).

In an interview with site AnimeNewsNetwork, FUNimation Entertainment copyright specialist Evan Flournay said they generally see AMVs as a sort of free advertising. "The basic thinking going into fan videos is thus: if it whets the audience's appetite, we'll leave it alone. But if it sates the audience's appetite, it needs to come down," he says.

In recent years there has been an increased demand, primarily on the part of the record industry, for the removal of AMVs from sites like YouTube and AnimeMusicVideos.org, with particular regard to YouTube due to its relative popularity as well as its for-profit status. Public discussions and perspectives give varying accounts of exactly how widespread these actions have become. Most notably in November 2005, the administrator of AnimeMusicVideos.org (Phade) was contacted by Wind-up Records, requesting the removal of content featuring the work of the bands Creed, Evanescence, and Seether.

While music labels and corporations generally see AMVs in negative light, often the actual musical artists in question do not hold the same views. A number of AMV editors report to having had positive contact with various artists, including Trey Gunn and Mae. Japanese electronic duo Boom Boom Satellites teamed with site AMVJ Remix Sessions to sanction an AMV competition to help promote one of their singles, going so far as to provide the source material for editors to use. The winner's video would be featured during one of the pair's tours. The first of this competition took place in January 2008 using the song "Easy Action" and the anime movie Vexille. A second competition took place later that year in November using the song "Shut Up and Explode" and the anime Xam'd: Lost Memories.

In his book Code: Version 2.0 and a subsequent talk in Google's AtGoogleTalks Author's Series, Creative Commons founder Lawrence Lessig specifically mentions AMVs as an example when dealing with the legality and creative nature of digital remix culture.

== See also ==
- Vidding
- D-TV
- HBTV
- Remix culture
