= Save Our Show =

Save Our Show may refer to:

- "SOS (Save Our Show)", a 2021 episode of the web series Battle for Dream Island
- "Save our show", a series of campaigns associated with Fans4Writers during the 2007 writers' strike
