= Vidding =

Fan labor practice in media fandom

Vidding is a fan labor practice in media fandom of creating music videos from the footage of one or more visual media sources, thereby exploring the source itself in a new way. The creator may choose video clips in order to focus on a single character, support a particular romantic pairing between characters, criticize or celebrate the original text, or point out an aspect of the TV show or film that they find under-appreciated. The resulting video may then be shared via one or more social media outlets and online video platforms such as YouTube. The creators refer to themselves as "vidders"; their product as "vids", "fanvids", "fanvideos", "songvids", or the more recently adopted name "edits"; and the act itself is referred to as vidding.

Vidding can occur within a fandom; however, it is also often considered its own fandom, as vidding fans will often watch vids simply because they are vids. (This is distinct from fan fiction readers and other fans, for instance, who tend to choose what to engage based on source text more than form.) Accordingly, vidding has its own dedicated fan conventions, including Vividcon and VidUKon.

Fan videos within the world of anime fandom are distinct from the videos created by vidders. A fan-made music video using anime footage is called an anime music video or AMV, not a fanvid. Most vidders in media fandom are women, though there are many men, too.

== History ==
Vidding began in 1975, when Kandy Fong synced Star Trek stills on a slide projector with music from a cassette player. Fong's slideshow was first presented publicly at Bjo Trimble's Equicon/Filmcon convention in 1975, where it was celebrated as the first source of "new" Star Trek stills since the conclusion of the original show. She performed her vids with live cutting at fan conventions, which continue to be one of the main venues for vid-watching.

When home videocassette tape recorders became available in the mid-1970s, vidders began producing live-action vids that were recorded onto media that could be shown at fan conventions and further distributed to fans. Substantial technical and artistic skill were required to cut vids together, often requiring footage from multiple VCRs to be placed on the same tape, with the added challenge of exact timing. Typical vids could take 6–8 hours to produce, and more elaborate ones could take substantially longer. Vidders, predominately women, passed this knowledge on to each other.

Vidders during the 1980s and 1990s formed collectives, such as California Crew, GloRo Productions, Bunnies from Hell, the Chicago Loop, and the Media Cannibals. The collectives shared equipment allowing for more technically complicated vid production. Sterling Eidolan and the California Crew subgroup, Odd Woman Out, made a notable metavid, "Pressure", in 1990. "Pressure" recorded the actual process of making a vid, depicting the female vidders, and the skill necessary in order to produce the work during the VCR age.

With the rise of digital media, greater bandwidth, and the widespread availability of free, albeit basic, video editing software such as iMovie and Windows Movie Maker or more professional and in use ones such as Sony Vegas, the skill level required for vidding has been reduced and the number of distribution outlets has increased. As a result, both the number of vidders and the number of accessible vids has skyrocketed. Vidding has become more individualized in the digital era and collectives have largely ceased to exist. However, in the form of "collabs", also known as collaborations between two or more vidders, complex joint products persist. Ask.fm accounts allow for modern continuation of knowledge sharing amongst vidders, especially women.

Owing to concerns that the outside community would not understand the vids and the context of vidding, as well as some copyright and intellectual property concerns, many of the most experienced vidders do not make their vids readily-accessible on public venues such as YouTube, although this is changing.

The Museum of the Moving Image in New York ran an exhibition from 29 June – 14 October 2013 called Cut Up which included highlights of style from the original by Kandy Fong to "Vogue (300)" by Luminosity.

On display were:

- "Both Sides Now" by Kandy Fong (1980)
- "Tempers of Revenge" by MVD and Caren Parnes (1984)
- "Data's Dream" by Shadow Songs (1994)
- "A Fannish Taxonomy of Hotness (Hot Hot Hot)" by Sandy and Rache (2005)
- "I Put You There" by Laura Shapiro and Lithiumdoll (2006)
- "Vogue (300)" by Luminosity (2007)

== Schools ==
There are three main schools of vidding:

- MediaWest vidders congregated around the MediaWest*Con fan convention, which began in the 1970s and provided a vid room. Vids were shown repeatedly, and people wandered in and out all day. MediaWest-type vids are meant to be understood by people who don't bring a lot of context to them (including even knowledge of the fandom source text), so are often spectacular, splashy, or funny.
- Living room vidders, the followers of Mary Van Deusen, are designed to be watched by fans multiple times in a quiet environment. These vids call for viewers to have intimate familiarity with the source and to study the vid's visual choices through multiple watchings, so that the vidder's arguments can be understood. Fully understanding a living room vid is most akin to poetry analysis; it usually calls for understanding the source text, learning the song lyrics, watching for visual metaphors and alterations to the original scenes, as well as being involved in the community.
- San Francisco vidders tell stories similarly to Mary Van Deusen and her followers, but with an art school sensibility. This school of vidding emerged in the late 1990s and early 2000s, and is defined by more concern for the visual and different use of color and motion than classic vidding.

In the age of YouTube and other video sharing sites on the internet, there is increasing cross-pollination between these schools, as well as between vids, anime music videos, machinima, and political remix music videos.

== Terminology ==
Vidding uses all the terminology common to media fandom, as well as terminology developed for vidding-specific needs. For instance, "MM" may stand for multimedia, meaning a vid made from more than one source show. A "garbage can vid" is a multimedia vid with source from tens or even hundreds of shows and movies. A frequently used vidding term is "slash" in which footage of two characters (typically heterosexual) are combined to create a homosexual bond in the alternate universe. When slash applies to two women, it is referred to as femslash.

== Content ==
Fanvids are created based on material from TV shows, movies, and occasionally official music videos to make an argument through juxtaposing the original video with song lyrics. In vids, the music is an analytic device rather than a soundtrack. Fanvids may function as a cross between narrative story-telling and visual poetry, a form of visual essay that uses the source material itself to put forward one aspect of how the author sees the source; potentially reframing the original material in a novel manner. Alternatively, vids may be little more than a string of shots strung together, akin to a thesis statement without significant backup.

Many fanvids are concerned with shipping, the love stories that a fan sees within their favorite films or TV shows. Existing romantic scenes may be further romanticized through video transformations or song choice. The author may also argue for a romantic pairing that does not occur in the source text through juxtaposing relevant scenes or even splicing in additional material. Supporters or "shippers" of on-screen couples may also manipulate clips to retroactively change scenes to fit a within-vid reality that incorporates their pairing. This led to the inevitable creation of a whole new vocabulary currently in use amongst vidders which includes terms such as shipwars and OTPs.

YouTube vidding is a community with hundreds of thousands of users now taking part.

== Copyright and fair use ==
As television and online media increasingly intermingle in the age of new media and digitization, a prosumer can create their own work out of copyrighted material.

US Copyright law attributes the clips and the music in fanvids as the property of those who originally produced them for radio and television/film. As a result, some fans and lawyers worry and argue that fanvids constitute a breach of copyright law. Other fans and lawyers, such as those in the Organization for Transformative Works, argue that fanvids fall under the fair use exception to copyright laws, as only small snippets of video images are used creatively and no profit is made.

Websites such as YouTube caution against the uploading of copyrighted material, even though thousands of fanvids have been uploaded there. Fans with material on that website will sometimes find their vids removed with a copyright infringement message.

More recently, though, James H. Billington (librarian of the United States Congress), in his statement relating to section 1201 rulemaking, noted that circumvention of security protocols for motion pictures on DVDs will not be subject to the DMCA statute against circumvention. Billington specifically allows for the creation of "non-commercial videos" which would include vids.

== See also ==
- Anime music video
- Copyright infringement
- Corecore
- Culture jamming
- Fandom
- Fan fiction
- Found footage
- Machinima
- Remix culture
- Sludge content
- Video scratching
- VJing
- YouTube poop
