= MediaWest*Con =

Convention for TV and film

MediaWest*Con is one of the largest and longest running media-based (TV shows/film) fan-run conventions in the United States. It is held annually over Memorial Day weekend in Lansing, Michigan. The convention emerged in the late 1970s, beginning as T'Con in 1978 and 2'Con in 1979 before taking on the name MediaWest*Con in 1981. The convention remains the world's largest gathering of fanzine writers, artists, and publishers, and for decades was the event where most new science fiction and fantasy fanzines were released. The annual "Fan Quality Awards" for Fanzine excellence, known as the "Fan Q's", have been given out at MediaWest*Con since 1981. In addition, the convention's art show has been the principal location for the display and sale of published fanzine art and illustrations.

== History ==
MediaWest*Con was founded by members of T'Kuhtian Press, then a registered student organization at Michigan State University. The earliest convention sponsored by T'Kuhtian Press (jointly with boojums press) was T'Con in 1978, followed by 2'Con in 1979. T'Kuhtian Press was also active in fanzine publishing, principally Star Trek and, later, Star Wars fanzines. Because of this the convention soon attracted the attention of other fanzine publishers and writers. By the time the name was changed to MediaWest*Con in 1981 the convention was well known in the fanzine community as the event at which to introduce new fanzine releases. Many fanzine releases have been timed around the convention's annual Memorial Day schedule.

MediaWest*Con was the first media fandom convention focused on the "media geek" culture that emerged following a split between people who liked all forms of science fiction media, and those fans of only literary science fiction. At first MediaWest*Con was a convention principally for fans of Star Trek, Star Wars, and the Indiana Jones franchise, as well as fans of Monty Python's Flying Circus. After a few years the con began attracting other fandoms, such as Doctor Who, Beauty and the Beast, Red Dwarf, and the Hitchhiker's Guide to the Galaxy. By the 21st century it boasted the attendance of fans of over fifty different science fiction media fandoms.

Annual activities at MediaWest*Con include awards for fan fiction zines, cosplay, filking, costuming, plays and skits, and crafts. MediaWest*Con is also notable as the first convention to host a dedicated place to show fan vids and give awards for fan videos.

MediaWest*Con remains a fan-run and organized convention and is not affiliated with any national promotion group, or business. The convention has no paid "guest stars" or celebrity appearances, although several celebrities from science fiction shows have appeared over the years at their own expense. The focus of the convention remains fan interaction in a setting promoting fannish interests with a special emphasis on the production and sale of media fanzines.

On February 4, 2020, the convention posted an update on its official blog informing members that MW*C 40 was canceled due to lack of memberships. All paid memberships were refunded. According to the organizers, it is unlikely that there will be any future MediaWest*Cons.
