= Fan mail =

Mail sent to a public figure by fans

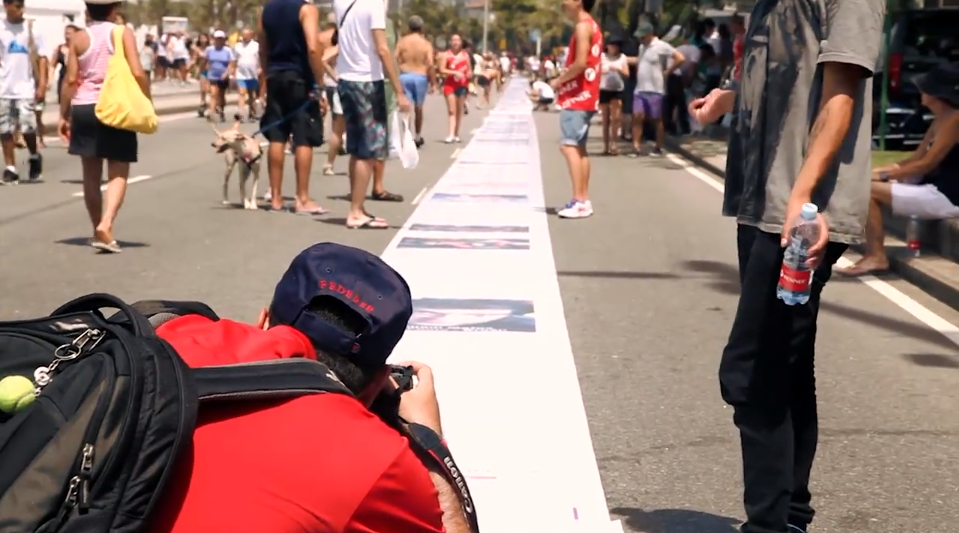
Madonna fandom of Brazil created the world's biggest fan letter (pictured) in 2012.

Fan mail is mail sent to a public figure, especially a celebrity, by their admirers or "fans". In return for a fan's support and admiration, public figures may send an autographed poster, photo, reply letter, or note thanking their fans for their encouragement, gifts, and support. Fan mail sent to public figures can be through postal mail, email, social media, and other platforms that allow fans and users to communicate with their favorite public figures.

== Overview ==
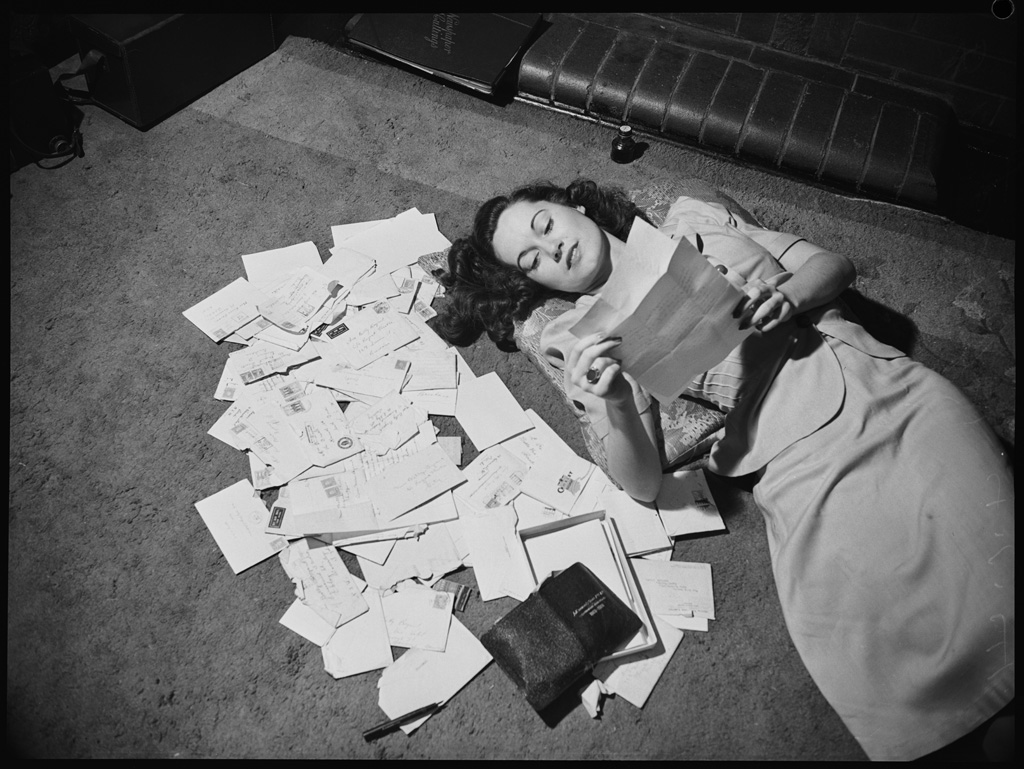
Australian actress Betty Bryant reads letters from fans, 1941.

Fan mail may be in the form of letters, cards, artwork, gifts, comments on social media accounts, and so on. People often send fan mail to various public entertainers, figures such as politicians, athletes, actors, artists, writers, singers, bands, coaches of sports teams, bloggers, and social media stars seem to be the main target. Responses can take a great deal of time to come or never come at all. Since a major celebrity or public figure may receive thousands of pieces of fan mail every day, it is usually impossible for him/her to reply to or read them all and as a result his/her management team, often has the duty of canvassing the incoming mail. However, celebrities such as Tim Allen or Taylor Swift sometimes respond to fan mail. Directly after the 2001 anthrax attacks, some studios and agencies have refused to further take fan mail for safety and security reasons, and have referred fans to alternate forms of contact.

== Entertainment portrayal of fan mail ==
This gimmick has also been used with fictional characters; special episodes of Beavis and Butt-Head featured episodes with mail sent to the two characters and the Homestar Runner website regularly features emails sent to and answered by the cartoon's main antagonist, Strong Bad. Public reading and answering of fan mail was a common recurring element of the cult television program Mystery Science Theater 3000 and the TechTV/G4 game review program Xplay often featured hosts Adam Sessler and Morgan Webb answering fan mail at the end of episodes, often in a scornful and satirical manner due to respondents deeply disagreeing with the show's video game reviews. TLC's third studio album was named FanMail, and was a tribute to fans, with the names of many fans that had sent them fan mail over the years included in the album's insert.

In Puerto Rico, popular television children's show host, the Spaniard Pacheco was known for personally reading fan-mails, which usually in his case included drawings by children dedicated to him, on his weekdays television show Cine Recreo.

== Responses ==
Many fan mail responses started off as autographed photos but have gradually evolved to communication through social media. Many celebrities and public figures, such as Taylor Swift and J. K. Rowling, have been known to respond to fans, and sometimes to haters, through Tumblr and Twitter. There have been many occasions in which J. K. Rowling has interacted with fans through her Twitter account. Taylor Swift has also been known to go out of her way to respond to her fans and admirers and even send fans gift packages, a form of fan mail, to selected fans who she had learned about through their social media accounts. While some public figures have responded to fans via social media, it is often known that responses via postal mail by public figures are scarce or nonexistent and often not personal responses but responses by a public figure's management team.
