= Kandy Fong =

American filmmaker

Kandy Fong created the first fan videos in 1975, a slideshow of Star Trek images set to music. She is credited with creating the concept of "mash-ups", editing a TV show or a film by disconnecting the images from the original soundtrack and re-editing them to a song to tell a new story. Fong's media practice includes zine editing, short story writing, slideshow creation and sketch comedy.

== The United Federation of Phoenix ==
While attending Arizona State University in 1973, Fong was compelled by a newspaper advertisement to join a group of students in forming a Star Trek fan club. This club would become the United Federation of Phoenix" (UFP), which stands as the longest-running Star Trek fan club in the world.

== What do you do with a drunken Vulcan? ==
Fong constructed her first slideshow with another member of the UFP, John Fong, who had a collection of outtakes from the original Star Trek series. In collaboration with other club members, Fong assembled frames set to a tape-recorded audio track, that included narration written and read by Fong and, notably, an a cappella performance of the folk song "What Do You Do with a Drunken Vulcan?" The first public performance of the same slideshow took place in 1975 at a fan-run Star Trek convention. As her practice developed, Fong became interested in videotaping her performances and developed a two-projector technique allowing for soft fades between slides.

=== Correspondence with Gene Roddenberry ===
At Equicon, Gene Roddenberry expressed an interest in the slideshows. Roddenberry had been trying to convince Paramount Studios that there was demand for a Star Trek film and granted Fong permission to continue making slideshows. The two maintained a correspondence and Roddenberry, who provided her with Star Trek slide outtakes.

=== Both Sides Now ===
Both Sides Now sets images of Mr. Spock to a recorded performance of the titular song by Leonard Nimoy. Fong says that her Both Sides Now performance was inspired by the music video for the Beatles' "Strawberry Fields Forever" single. As with Fong's work, this 1967 promotional clip interprets a song with images that do not depict the performance of the song by the artist. In an interview with media studies academic Francesca Coppa, Fong described her interpretation of the performance:

Spock is such a dual character: half human, half Vulcan. Half trying to follow Starfleet. half trying to do the whole thing with his parents. The two sides of him. And then there's Chapel, and then there's T'Pring, and then there's Kirk. There is just so many different sides to him that "Both Sides Now"—he's trying to be both sides now. And it seemed to just fit him so very well.

== Exhibitions ==
Fong's video recording for Both Sides Now was included in the 2013 exhibition Cut Up at the Museum of the Moving Image in Queens. It has also been shown in exhibition at Vancouver Art Gallery.
