= James Lull =

American social scientist and author (born 1944)

James Lull (born December 23, 1944) is an American social scientist and author known for ethnographic research on the interaction between communications technology and culture. In addition to his academic career, Lull worked for many years as a media professional. His most recent scholarly work focuses on the decisive role of communication in human evolution.

== Early life and education ==
Lull was born in Owatonna, Minnesota. He began working at age fifteen as a radio announcer in his home town. He joined the US Army after graduating from high school and trained to become an information and broadcast specialist at the Armed Forces Information School, Fort Slocum, New York, in 1963.

Lull was stationed at Fort Benning, Georgia, for nearly two years. During off duty hours he worked as an announcer for WCLS, WDAK, and WRBL radio in Columbus, Georgia. He was sent to Vietnam in 1965 as a combat journalist with the Army's 1st Air Cavalry Division. In 1966 Lull transferred to Armed Forces Radio Vietnam in Saigon where he became a staff announcer during the “Good Morning, Vietnam” era.

After being honorably discharged from the military Lull took degrees in history from El Camino College (Torrance, CA) and Radio-TV-Film from San Jose State University, California. As an undergraduate student he also worked full-time as staff announcer and later program director of KSJO-FM, San Jose. Lull received an MS degree with Honors in Telecommunication and Film from the University of Oregon. His graduate work continued at the University of Wisconsin-Madison, under the tutelage of the rhetorical scholar, Edwin Black. An article based on Lull's doctoral dissertation, “Mass Media and Family Communication: An Ethnography of Audience Behavior,” won the Golden Monograph Award from the National Communication Association.

== Career ==
In 1976, Lull became assistant professor of speech at the University of California, Santa Barbara, where he taught for seven years. During that time, he began a program of ethnographic research in China that led to the publication of China Turned On: Television, Reform, and Resistance. Lull maintained a second career in media at KTYD-FM, Santa Barbara, where he was employed as program director and staff announcer until 1983. He returned to his undergraduate alma mater, San Jose State University, to direct the radio-TV-film program in 1982, and later transferred into the university's Communication Studies Department, where as of 2015 he was emeritus professor. He has also been visiting professor at the University of California, Berkeley, the University of San Francisco, and the University of Pittsburgh’s Semester at Sea program.

Lull has been awarded two Fulbright Senior Scholar grants (Catholic University of Rio de Janeiro, Brazil; University of Colima, Mexico) and a Leverhulme Trust grant (Goldsmiths College, University of London). He holds honorary doctoral degrees from the University of Helsinki, Finland, and Inca Garcilaso de la Vega University, Peru. Lull has taught courses at universities in the People's Republic of China, Brazil, Venezuela, Finland, Denmark, England, Mexico, Chile, Argentina, and Sweden.

A fluent Spanish speaker, Professor Lull has spent much of his academic career working in Mexico and South America.

== Books ==
Lull’s first book, Popular Music and Communication (1987), helped establish popular music as a form of human communication within the academic field of communication studies. A revised second edition of the edited volume was published in 1992. His second book, World Families Watch Television (1988), is a collection of ethnographic studies that discuss how television influences the family, and how families use television within diverse cultural contexts.

His third book, Inside Family Viewing: Ethnographic Research on Television’s Audiences (1990), presents a collection of Lull’s essays on qualitative media audience research. The volume includes the article, “The Social Uses of Television,” which addresses how people actively engage television as a personal, social, and cultural resource. One year later, he published China Turned On:Television, Reform, and Resistance an audience-based empirical analysis of the role of television in China's modernization.

Lull's next project was Media, Communication, Culture: A Global Approach (1995) which explored how ideology, hegemony, and consciousness interact with human agency in everyday life across a range of global cultures. An expanded and revised second edition of that volume was published in 2000 where theoretical concepts including zones of indeterminacy, cultural programming, and superculture were introduced. A co-edited volume, Media Scandals: Morality and Desire in the Popular Culture Marketplace, was published in 1997. Another edited book, Culture in the Communication Age, followed in 2001.

Three editions of James Lull's multimedia book for college courses, Public Speaking: The Evolving Art, have been published since 2007.

Professor Lull's theoretical work became directly focused on the role of communication in shaping human evolution with publication of Culture-on-Demand: Communication in a Crisis World in 2007. In that volume, Lull also discusses cultural contradictions in global communication and depicts religious ideology and fundamentalism as barriers to global communication. A 2012 publication, co-authored with the Brazilian-American semiotician Eduardo Neiva, is The Language of Life: How Communication Drives Human Evolution. The authors analyze survival, sex, culture, morality, religion, and technological change as communications activity, challenging traditional approaches to communication theory.

James Lull's work has been translated into more than a dozen languages.

== Select bibliography ==
- 1987, 1992: Popular Music and Communication. Sage Publications.
- 1988: World Families Watch Television. Sage Publications.
- 1990: Inside Family Viewing: Ethnographic Research on Television’s Audiences. Routledge.
- 1991: China Turned On: Television, Reform, and Resistance. Routledge.
- 1995, 2000: Media, Communication, Culture: A Global Approach. Polity Press/Columbia University Press.
- 1997: Media Scandals: Morality and Desire in the Popular Culture Marketplace. Polity Press/Columbia University Press. (with Stephen Hinerman)
- 2001: Culture in the Communication Age. Routledge.
- 2007: Culture-on-Demand: Communication in a Crisis World. Routledge.
- 2008, 2012, 2015: Public Speaking: The Evolving Art. Wadsworth/Cengage.
- 2012: The Language of Life: How Communication Drives Human Evolution. Prometheus.
- 2020: Evolutionary Communication: An Introduction. Routledge.

== Selected work in Spanish ==
- Medios, Comunicación, Cultura: Una Aproximación Global: Buenos Aires: Amorrortu. (1997, 2009)
- “La Evolución de una Comunicación para un Mundo en Crisis.” In Agenda Académica para una Comunicación Abierta. Mexico City: UAEM. (2010). Edited by Jannet Valerio & Lenin Martell.
- “Los Usos Sociales de la Televisión.” (2007, 1980 original in English). Santiago, Chile: Diego Portales University.
- “La Estructuración de las Audiencias Masivas.” (1992). Lima, Peru: DiáLogos de la Comunicación.
- “Supercultura para la Epoca de la Comunicación.” (2002). Santiago Chile: Diego Portales University.
- “Los Placeres de Expresar y Comunicar.” (2008). Madrid: Comunicar.
- “Por Qué Era de la Comunicación?” (2009, 2001 original in English). Santiago, Chile. Alberto Hurtado University.
- “Cultura en Demanda” (2008) Chilean National Television and Diego Portales University.
