= Mary Westbrook Van Deusen =

American poet

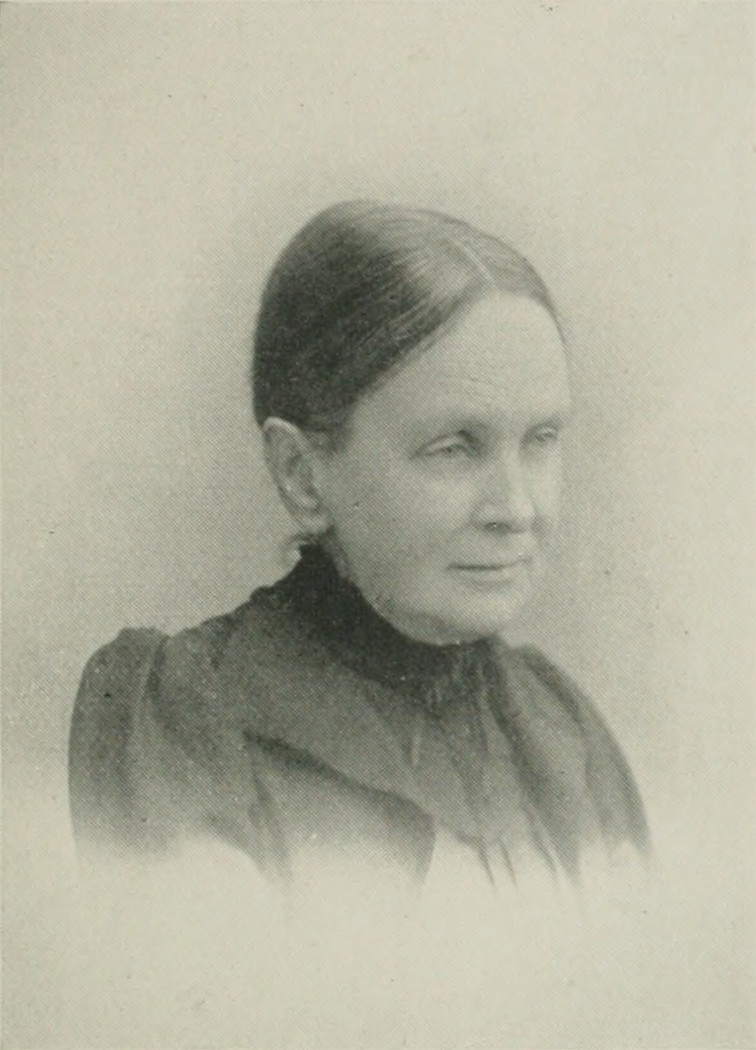
- Born: February 13, 1829; Fishkill, New York
- Died: October 16, 1908 (aged 79)
- Writing career
- Notable work: Rachel Du Mont: A Brave Little Maid of the Revolution (1883)

Mary Westbrook Van Deusen (February 13, 1829 – October 16, 1908), publishing under the name Mary Westbrook, was an American author of prose and verse.

== Career ==
She was born Mary Amanda Westbrook in Fishkill, New York, the daughter of Cornelius de Puy Westbrook, a pastor of the Dutch Church in nearby Peekskill, and Sarah (Beekman) Westbrook. In 1865 she married James Lansing Van Deusen of Rondout, New York.

She published both prose and poetry, mainly through the Freeman Company, of Kingston, New York. Her 1883 novel Rachel Du Mont: A Brave Little Maid of the Revolution was about the burning of Kingston during the American Revolution. It was successful enough to go through three editions in one year.

== Books ==
Novels

- Rachel Du Mont (1883)
- Gertrude Willoughby

Verse

- "Voices of My Heart"
