= Fan activism =

Engagement in social movements by a fandom

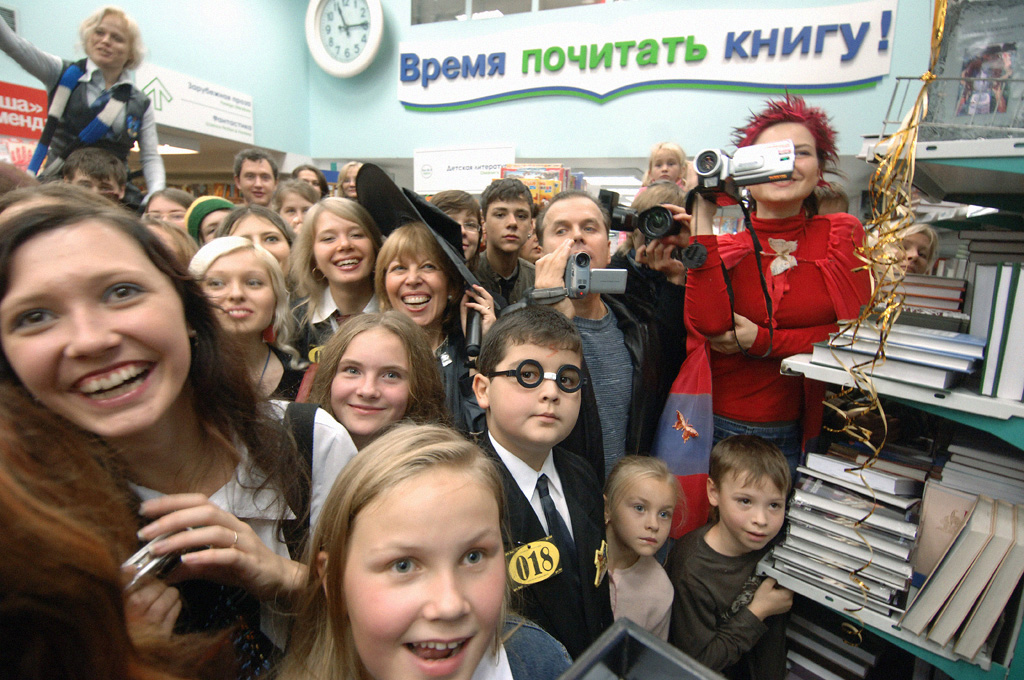
Harry Potter fans at a bookstore after the Russian translation of the book "Harry Potter and the Gift of Death" went on sale

Fan activism is the effort of a fan community to raise awareness of social concerns or otherwise support the ideals expressed by objects of the fandom. The rise of fan activism has been attributed to the emergence of new media. A 2012 quantitative study by Kahne, Feezell, and Lee suggests that there may be a statistically significant relationship between youths' participation in interest-driven activities online and their civic engagement later on in life.

Fan activism has become more politically and societally focused, and fandoms take up collective action often for issues that are not inter-fandom. Scholars share that "Fan and consumer activism are more visible than ever before, and the lines between these and traditional civic and political activities are blurring in today's increasingly "participatory" media and entertainment landscape".

Examples of fan activism include campaigns for social equality, representation of minorities in entertainment media, fundraising for organizations with common values, campaigning for the continuation of a television program or sporting team and defending fan works from commercial exploitation and allegations of copyright infringement. Fans may be mobilized to support such causes in response to celebrity endorsements. Activists may also leverage content worlds and fan-like activities as resources to be reconfigured for political engagement, as in the cases where real-life rights groups have used imagery and tropes from Avatar (2009 film) to attract mainstream media attention in the West Bank village of Bil'in and Orissa, India.

Notable groups that are historically associated with fan activism include Fandom Forward (formerly the Harry Potter Alliance), Fans4Writers, Nerdfighteria and the Organization for Transformative Works. More recently, K-pop fans have organized for a variety of political causes.

== History ==
Fan activism was originally geared toward fans wanting to save their favorite television shows. For example, in 1969, Bjo and John Trimble led a letter-writing campaign to "save Star Trek" to guarantee the show survived more series. More recently, Stargate SG-1 fans quickly responded on the Internet to rumor of the show's cancellation. In this case, they were able to use information found on various websites to figure out how networks made decisions regarding TV shows and argued for its continuation. There is some debate whether or not this fan activism represents traditional activism. While fan activism is considered to be a form of cultural activism by fans and some political scientists, it is often overlooked in literature, "suggesting a residual distinction between high and low culture". Gene Roddenberry provided a strong base for fan activists when he connected a utopian and humanist philosophy with science fiction and further used science fiction to support gender and racial equality.

Fan activism occurs when fans use their shared interests as a starting point to mobilise around social or political issues. Fan communities may raise awareness of social concerns or otherwise support the ideals expressed by objects of the fandom. Examples of fan activism include campaigns for social equality, representation of minorities in entertainment media, fundraising for organizations with common values, campaigning for the continuation of a television program or sporting team and defending fan works from commercial exploitation and allegations of copyright infringement. Fans may be mobilized to support such causes in response to celebrity endorsements.

The rise of fan activism has been attributed to the emergence of new media, and is described as "not about the mix between political concerns and culture but rather action that looks like political activism but is used toward nonpolitical ends." Fan activism has become more politically and societally focused, and fandoms take up collective action often for issues that are not inter-fandom. Scholars share that "Fan and consumer activism are more visible than ever before, and the lines between these and traditional civic and political activities are blurring in today's increasingly "participatory" media and entertainment landscape".

== Fan activist groups and movements ==
Fans throughout the years have mobilized to create platforms, groups, and movements to promote social change. Groups like Harry Potter Alliance, The Racebending Movement, and the Nerdfighters have historically attracted a significant amount of attention and research. In recent years, K-pop fans have also made headlines.

=== Fandom Forward ===
Fandom Forward (Formerly known as The Harry Potter Alliance) is a nonprofit organization that was initially run by Harry Potter fans but that has since expanded to include members of various fandoms. It was founded by Andrew Slack in 2005 to draw attention to human rights violations in Sudan. Since then, the organization's campaigns have focused on topics such as literacy, United States immigration reform, economic justice, gay rights, sexism, labor rights, mental health, body image, and climate change. They have received recognition from many popular figures in the Harry Potter community and have been the subject of multiple academic studies on fan activism and civic engagement among youth. It consists of more than 100,000 members who support several causes including Doctors for Health, Free Press, and The Gay-Straight Alliance. This movement, which was established in 2005 by its non-profit leader Andrew Slack, parallels Harry Potter's endeavors to combat Voldemort to the broader society's goals to challenge dominant power structures that oppress marginalized groups. The HPA has been active in its strides toward providing financial relief toward populations in need. For example, following the 2010 Haiti Earthquake, the HPA assembled to raise approximately $123,000 to provide five cargo planes that supplied medical resources to the country following this momentous event. The HPA also organizes its members into four Hogwarts houses to strengthen group solidarity and encourage members to spread awareness about social and political issues. Like in Harry Potter, these houses compete to earn points based on their abilities to inspire change and encourage direct action.

=== The Racebending Movement ===
Following the release of the 2010 live-action film, The Last Airbender, the Racebending Movement emerged to promote racial diversity in the Hollywood film industry. The film received criticism for casting white actors as the main characters who came from predominately East Asian heritage. As a form of protest against the whitewashing of non-white characters, a community of fans created the Racebending.com website to advocate the fair representation of minority groups. On this site, a large number of users post comments that instigate debates among active community members. This movement also has a strong presence on Tumblr where users cast people of color as traditionally white characters such as Bruce Wayne, Hermione Granger, and Luke Skywalker.

=== Nerdfighters ===
Hank and John Green created the Nerdfighters community in 2007 after gaining popularity from their Brotherhood 2.0 project where each brother posted a video to YouTube every other day for a year. Unlike fan activist groups such as the Harry Potter Alliance and the Racebending movement, the Nerdfighters community does not dedicate its efforts only toward promoting change. Rather, this community has a multifaceted creative output that incorporates music, fiction, and other forms of media with challenges, pranks, and games. The activities of the Nerdfighters community derive themselves from the work and interests of Hank and John Green; for example, the community's Positive Pranking Project consists of pranks that are similar to those found in John Green's novels Paper Towns and Looking for Alaska. The commonalities that appear between Green's books and the Nerdfighters include the objectives of establishing an environment that reinforces respect for others, intellectual and philosophical beliefs, linguistic play, and the goal to make world a better place for everyone.

=== K-pop fans ===
Korean pop music—or K-pop—fans, are known for mobilizing in political spaces. Originally finding community online due to their shared love of K-pop and the idols who create the music, they later "became celebrated online vigilantes". K-pop fans are cited as participating in everything from human rights campaigns to education programs throughout the years, often in tribute or honor of the idols they love. In 2020, large subsets of the K-pop community began a movement to disrupt a rally being held by Donald Trump as part of his reelection campaign. The rally was held at Tulsa, Oklahoma's BOK Center, with a 19,000-seat capacity. The Trump campaign in 2016 reported receiving one million ticket requests for the event. Despite the capacity and requests, the Tulsa Fire Department reported that the fire marshal counted 6,200 scanned tickets of attendees.

Many believe this to be the work of the K-pop fans who began requesting tickets in large quantities following a tweet by the Trump campaign inviting supporters to register for free tickets. They did this knowing they would not attend and shared the instruction for others to do so on their social media platforms. The social media posts, especially on TikTok, garnered millions of views as the idea spread and the movement found "Alt" or "Elite" TikTok, "on the quiet side where people do pranks and a lot of activism". As social posts gained more views and more people created their own content, many young internet users outside these two subsets began to participate. Although K-pop and young social media users take credit themselves for the largely empty venue, and media attributed the event to these subsets, it is difficult to fully prove that they were responsible. The social posts made ahead of the rally to encourage reserving tickets "were strategically deleted to ensure the guerrilla nature of the campaign, and concerns about COVID-19 may have further reduced ticket holder desire to show up".

Also in 2020, K-pop fans became active in the Black Lives Matter movement, raising money and infiltrating hashtags originated by those opposing the movement. In a specific instance during the protests following George Floyd's murder, K-pop fans caused technical difficulties for the Dallas Police Department. The department sent a Tweet requesting people share videos of "illegal activity protests" through the iWatch Dallas app. Soon after, a different tweet urged K-pop fans to send fancams to the app instead. Two hours after the tweet encouraging the spam, Dallas police tweeted "Due to technical difficulties iWatch Dallas app will be down temporarily." The app also garnered more than 4,000 ratings and reviews, the majority negative. In a press release regarding the event, Dallas police did not name a cause for the app being temporarily down, stating that a cause was "still being determined." The app was active again shortly.

=== Little Pink ===
Little Pink (Chinese: 小粉红; pinyin: xiǎo fěnhóng) is a term used to describe Chinese nationalists on the internet. They are primarily active on Chinese social media, with some active on social media sites blocked in China such as Facebook, Twitter, and Instagram. The term originated in 2008 to describe predominantly young female nationalists in internet fandom subcultures. After 2015, it became more broadly applied regardless of gender.

== Adaptation of content from the fandom object ==
Activists may leverage content worlds and fan-like activities as resources for political engagement, as in the cases where real-life rights groups have used imagery and tropes from Avatar (2009 film) to attract mainstream media attention in the West Bank village of Bil'in and Orissa, India. Other Palestinian activists have painted themselves as the films' Na'vi and marched along the border of Gaza.

The Hunger Games fans have incorporated the three finger salute into labor protests.

== Analysis ==
A report compiled by fan campaign organizers in 2021 and 2022 identified the four key values of fan activism as being intentionality, imagination, accountability and community care.

A 2012 quantitative study by Kahne, Feezell, and Lee suggests that there may be a statistically significant relationship between youths' participation in interest-driven activities online and their civic engagement later on in life."
