= Interest-driven activities =

Interest-driven activities are activities in which participants create and share content, in contrast to merely consuming content.

Interest-driven activities are distinct from purely political networks as well as purely social, friendship-driven activities, such as using social networks.

== Rates of interest-driven activities ==
About one-third of youth surveyed in 2011 engage in interest-driven activities on a weekly basis. These activities include posting comments, reviews and critiques, create one's own media to share online, and giving help or suggestions to others.

== Link to civic engagement ==
Youth engaged in interest-driven activities online are simultaneously gaining "knowledge, skills, and networks, or what we call digital social capital, which increases their levels of political activity." Research has found that Interest-driven communities offer youth compelling reasons to connect, create, and collaborate, and may serve as valuable entry points for civic educators.

Youth participation in such non-political, interest-driven communities has been found to be a strong predictor of their civic participation.16 Young people who are highly involved in interest-driven communities are more likely to volunteer, fundraise for a cause, and work together to solve community problems. Those who are heavily involved in nonpolitical interest-driven activities are "more than five times as likely to engage in participatory politics and nearly four times as likely to participate in all political acts as those infrequently involved in such activities." This survey controlled for demographic, socioeconomic, and attitudinal characteristics.

Other researchers have posited that this linkage could be the result of the peer-to-peer exchange and mentorship common in such participatory cultures.

== Exposure to diversity of ideas ==
Youth report that non-political, interest-driven participation exposes them to more diverse perspectives on civic and political issues, even though that is not the goal of the communities in question. A study investigating the same question with adults found a majority of those engaged in online sports, entertainment, and hobby communities exchange political views, and are most likely to be exposed to divergent views.
