= Fans4Writers =

Fans4Writers is a fan activist movement which supported the striking writers of the WGA during the 2007 Writers Guild of America strike. The organization was not associated with the WGA, and indeed was notable for its unprecedented show of solidarity by individuals who were neither directly involved in contract negotiations, nor had a financial stake in the outcome.

While the group was first proposed by fans of Joss Whedon, it came to embrace more than 40 self-identified fandoms. They called themselves "fans of TV shows and movies, fans of actors, fans of directors, fans of producers, crew and everyone involved in the team effort of crafting wonder. But most of all we are fans of writers, because they are where the wonder begins. They write the words we remember, they create the characters we love, they think up the lines that stay with us forever. As supporters of the people behind the scenes, who develop and write the stories that have meant so much to so many, we wanted to do something tangible to show them that we support the Writers Guild of America strike."

Fans4Writers solicited financial support for its activities, which included bringing food to picket lines and skywriting messages of support at the Rose Bowl. Money left over after the strike was contributed to the WGA Strike Fund.

The organization stated its support for "the writers in their fight for fair treatment and equitable pay...with our thoughts, with food deliveries, with money, and we will pick up signs and march with them until a resolution is found. We do it in appreciation, and because it's right."

The Internet-based fan movement received some online press coverage ancillary to the strike itself, and Brenda Lawhorn, Fans4writers' Campaign Coordinator, was interviewed on Public Radio International's Fair Game.

However, WGA member and Battlestar Galactica writer Jane Espenson was quoted on fan involvement:

"I'm not sure that [fan involvement], which is so clear on the Internet, is being made as clear as it could be in the mainstream press...it's the stuff with the mainstream, grassroots fans who come out in amazing numbers and send us food on the picket lines every day...that's a bigger part of our everyday strike experience than the involvement of the movie stars."

The organization's existence and activities highlighted one of the main sticking points in the contract negotiations—the significance of the Internet and other "new media" distribution channels. The fan involvement in the strike could also be seen as an outgrowth of trends in which the audience had become more vocal as consumers of entertainment. Striking writers closed the circle by soliciting fan action on their behalf and specifically referring those upset at the loss of their favorite programs to the Fans4writers website, alongside the WGA's own strike site, in order to register their sentiments and become involved.

Successful use of the internet to organize "save our show" campaigns had garnered significant attention, as when supporters of Jericho inundated CBS with grievances in protest of the program's cancellation. This and other similar fan-organized publicity stunts on behalf of television shows appeared to have inspired WGA strikers themselves to undertake a similar campaign of sending pencils to the CEOs of the media conglomerates in a position to influence the Alliance of Motion Picture and Television Producers.

Fans4Writers received designation as Yahoo.com's Site of the Day on November 21, 2007.
