= Hollywood Ending (disambiguation) =

Hollywood Ending is a 2002 American comedy film.

Hollywood Ending may also refer to:

== Music ==
- "Hollywood Ending", a song in the 2017 musical film Anna and the Apocalypse
- "Hollywood Ending", a song by Sleater-Kinney on the album One Beat

== Television ==
- "Hollywood Ending" (The Simple Life episode), 2007 television episode
- "Hollywood Ending" (Agent Carter), 2016 television episode
- "A Hollywood Ending", the final episode of Hollywood

== Literature ==
- Hollywood, Ending, a 2026 John Green novel
