= Hollywood, Ending =

Adult fiction novel by John Green

- Author: John Green
- Cover artist: Cassie Vu
- Language: English
- Genre: Realistic fiction
- Published: September 22, 2026
- Publisher: Dutton Books
- Publication place: United States
- Media type: Print (hardcover)
- Pages: 368
- ISBN: 9780525426073
- Website: hollywoodendingbook.com

Hollywood, Ending is a novel by American author John Green, published on September 22, 2026, by Dutton Books. It follows Green's nonfiction book Everything Is Tuberculosis (2025) and is his first novel since Turtles All the Way Down (2017). The story centers on two young actors and how their lives change from the fame gained from their roles in a biopic about Andy Warhol. The book debuted as a number one New York Times Best Seller and received positive reviews.

== Writing and publication ==
Unlike his previous novels, which were young adult fiction, Hollywood, Ending is intended for adults. Green spoke of his shift toward adult fiction during a 2024 talk at Stanford University, saying that he felt increasingly disconnected from young adults. Green stated on his YouTube channel, Vlogbrothers, that he had begun writing Hollywood, Ending after the release of his previous novel, Turtles All the Way Down, in 2017, but had been unsure about completing the book due to "personal reasons". He featured an early version of Hollywood, Ending in what he described as "a series of semi-secret livestreams" during the COVID-19 pandemic.

Hollywood, Ending was published on September 22, 2026, by Dutton Books, an imprint of Penguin Random House. Like all of Green's prior novels, it was edited by Julie Strauss-Gabel. The cover art was designed by Cassie Vu.

Green went on a twenty-city book tour to promote the book from September 20 to October 13.

== Description ==
John Green reading an excerpt from the book

Hollywood, Ending is told from the points of view of two characters, Kai Laramie and Juniper Castillo. The two young actors star in a biopic about Andy Warhol, titled Andy Warhol Never Gets Old. As they deal with newfound fame from the film's success, they fall in love with each other. Green and Dutton Books have described the book's themes as relating to fame and the attention economy. Green stated that it is about "navigating love and loss all while participating in the strange, complicated exchanges of attention and trauma of the social internet that has become something no longer reserved for movie stars alone".

== Reception ==
Hollywood, Ending received positive reviews and sold well. The book received starred reviews from Kirkus Reviews and Booklist. It debuted as a number one New York Times Best Seller in the Combined Print & E-books Fiction and as a number one USA Today Best Seller.
