= Everything Is Tuberculosis =

2025 nonfiction book by John Green

- Author: John Green
- Cover artist: Grace Han
- Language: English
- Subject: Tuberculosis
- Publisher: Crash Course Books
- Publication date: March 18, 2025
- Media type: Print, audiobook
- Pages: 208
- ISBN: 978-0-525-42605-9
- Website: everythingistb.com

Everything Is Tuberculosis: The History and Persistence of Our Deadliest Infection is a book by American author John Green about tuberculosis, a curable disease usually brought on by the bacteria Mycobacterium tuberculosis that is the leading cause of death from an infectious disease. The book argues that the disease is no longer primarily caused by the bacteria, but instead by human choices. It was published on March 18, 2025, and is Green's second nonfiction book. The book was well received and became a New York Times number one bestseller in nonfiction.

== Background ==
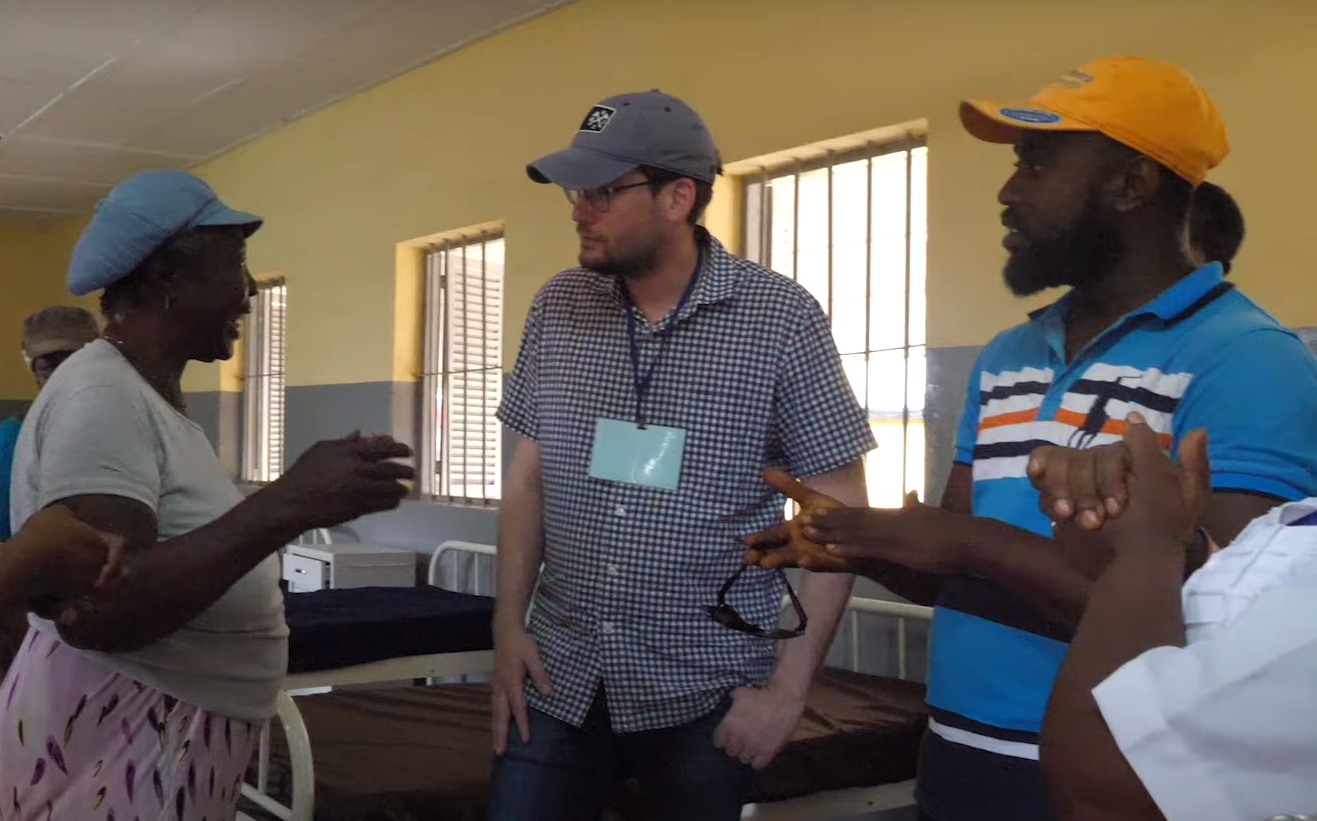
John Green in the Kissy Psychiatric Hospital (now known as Sierra Leone Psychiatric Hospital) in Freetown, Sierra Leone, in April 2019

John Green is an American young adult novelist who wrote the 2012 bestseller The Fault in Our Stars, which was later adapted into a 2014 film. He also hosts the YouTube channel Vlogbrothers which he started with his brother, Hank Green, in 2007. From that YouTube channel started the annual Project for Awesome charity event also in 2007, which supports Partners In Health, among other charities. Following his last novel Turtles All the Way Down in 2017, Green described himself as "retired" from young adult fiction. He published a book of essays, The Anthropocene Reviewed, in 2021, which acted as a loose memoir.

Green became interested in tuberculosis on a visit to Sierra Leone with Partners In Health in 2019, where he became aware that it was not "a problem of the past" but an ongoing global issue despite being curable. He spent several years engaging with experts and learning about the disease, speaking about it before the United Nations in 2023. That year, he also rallied his audience to petition Johnson & Johnson and Cepheid to ease access to the tuberculosis treatment bedaquiline and rapid diagnostic testing for multidrug-resistant tuberculosis, respectively, which both companies did.

== Summary and release ==
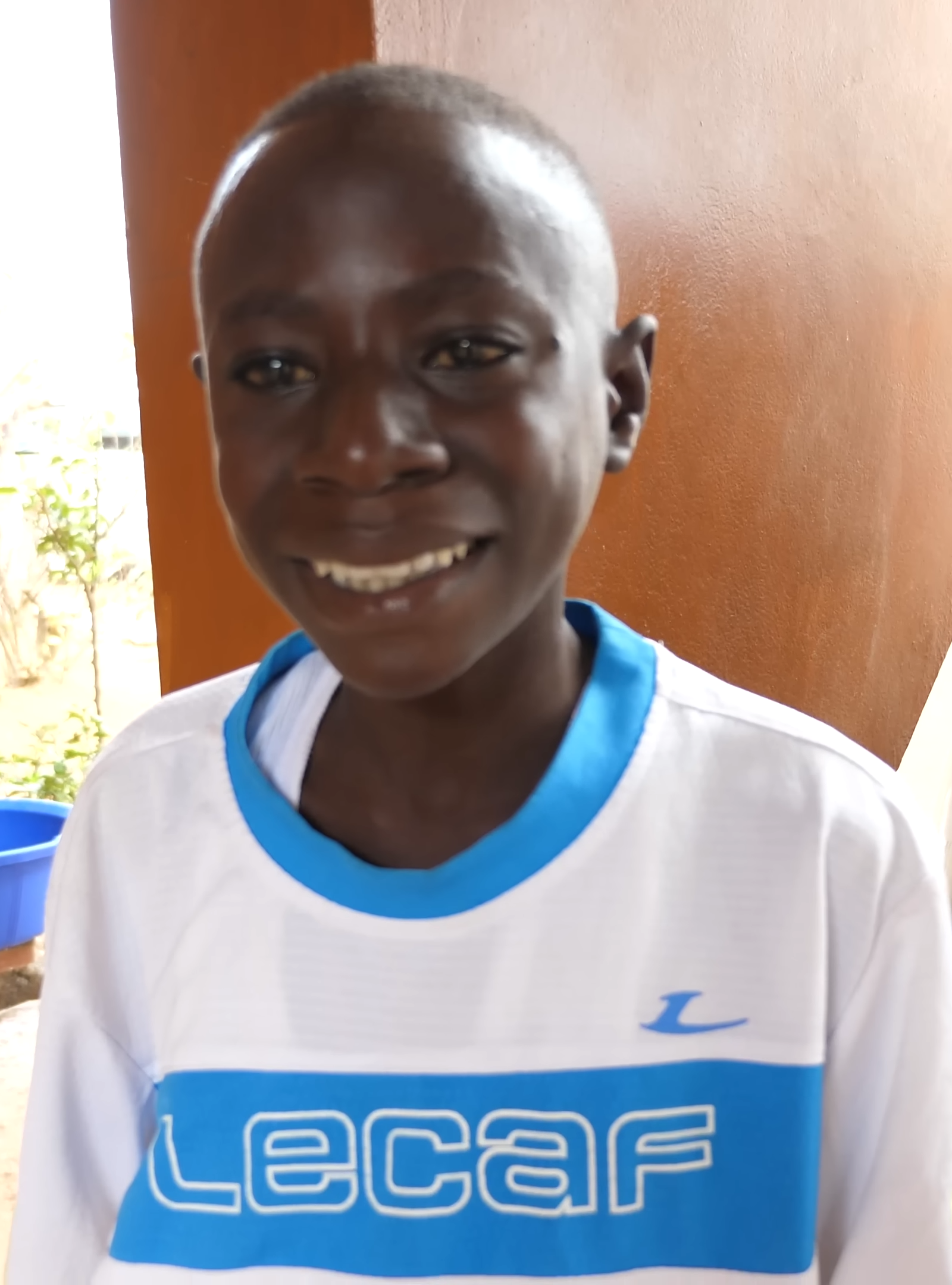
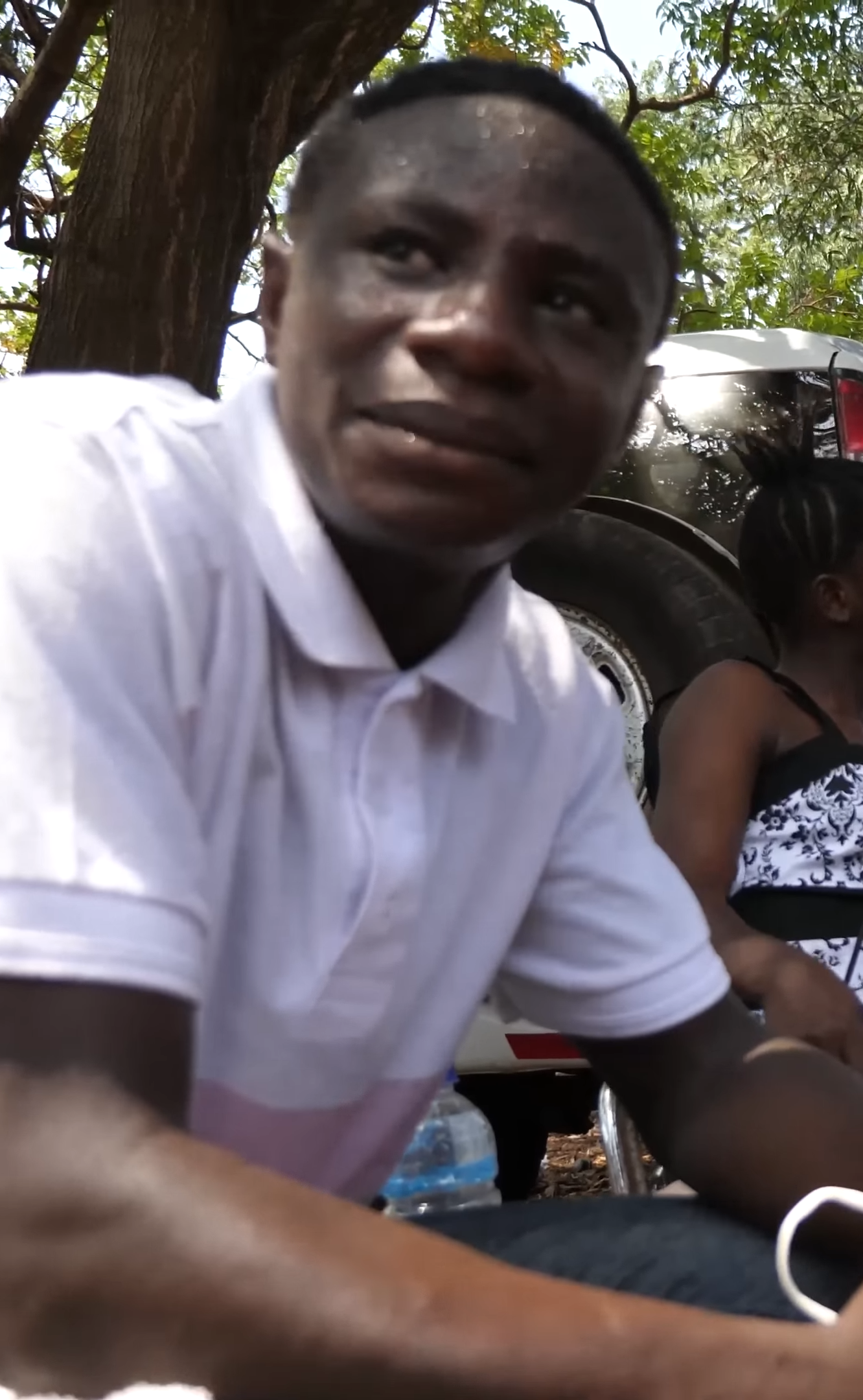
Henry, a young tuberculosis patient profiled by Green in the book, shown at 16 (left) and four years later (right) after a new treatment regimen

Green described the book as "a history of human responses to tuberculosis intertwined with a contemporary story of one person's experience", that person being Henry, a young tuberculosis patient Green met in 2019 in Sierra Leone who shares his son's name. He announced the book's title, Everything Is Tuberculosis, on October 22, 2024. The cover was designed by Grace Han, who also designed the cover for The Anthropocene Reviewed.

The book was officially released on March 18, 2025, through Crash Course Books, a new imprint of Penguin Young Readers that is an extension of the educational YouTube series Crash Course. The first run was announced to be 500,000 copies, of which Green signed 100,000. Green also narrated the audiobook version. Green went on a book tour in support of the book's release, starting off in Indianapolis, where he lives.

== Reception ==
The book was well received and sold well. Kirkus Reviews gave the book a starred review, saying, "This highly readable call to action could not be more timely." Booklist and School Library Journal also gave the book starred reviews. AP News reviewed the book, calling it "reflective and earnest [...] Little nuggets of personalization consistently bring us back to our shared humanity." In an overall positive review, The A.V. Club stated that "while Green provides a great general analysis of why the disease tests our very humanity, it's easy to be left wanting more." Library Journal called the book, "An interesting but scattered view of [tuberculosis]." Rebecca Robbins writing for The New York Times stated that while "Green does an admirable job introducing readers to a disease they would otherwise be unlikely to learn about," she thought he was "frustratingly vague in assigning blame for the persistence of tuberculosis."

The book was a New York Times number-one bestseller in nonfiction for multiple weeks, remaining on the list for 23 weeks.
