= John Green =

American author and YouTuber (born 1977)

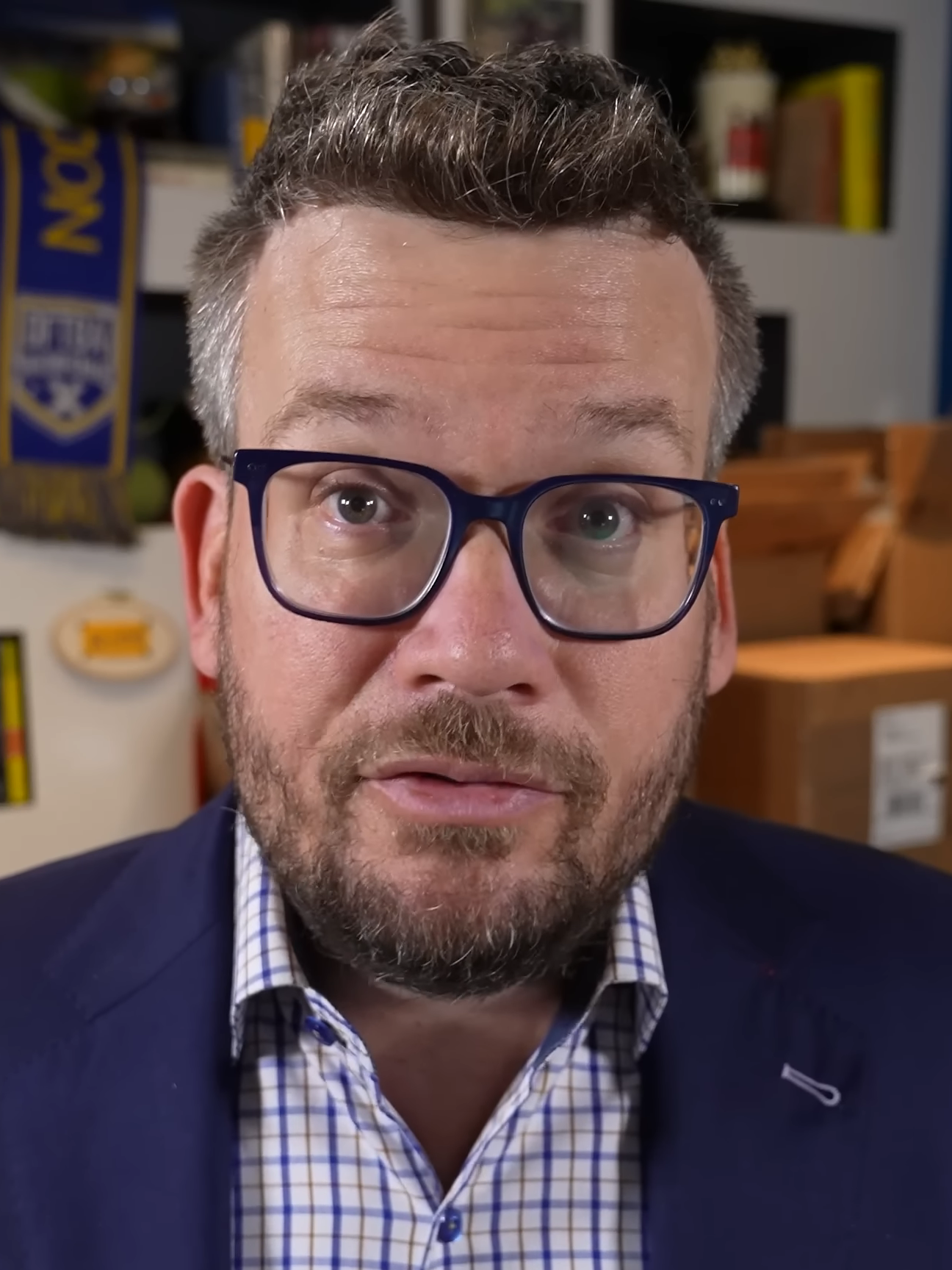
- Green in 2024
- Born: John Michael Green; August 24, 1977 (age 49); Indianapolis, Indiana, U.S.
- Education: Kenyon College (BA)
- Occupations: Author; vlogger; philanthropist
- Spouse: Sarah Urist Green (m. 2006)
- Children: 2
- Relatives: Hank Green (brother)
- Writing career
- Period: 2005–present
- Genres: Young adult fiction; bildungsroman; romance
- Notable works: The Fault in Our Stars (2012); Vlogbrothers (2007–present); Crash Course (2012–present)
- Notable awards: Michael L. Printz Award 2006 Looking for Alaska; Edgar Award 2009 Paper Towns
- Website: johngreenbooks.com

John Michael Green (born August 24, 1977) is an American author and YouTuber. His books have more than 50 million copies in print worldwide, including The Fault in Our Stars (2012), which is one of the best-selling books of all time. Green's rapid rise to fame and idiosyncratic voice are credited with creating a major shift in the young adult fiction market. Green is also well known for his work in online video, most notably his YouTube ventures with his younger brother Hank Green.

Born in Indianapolis, Indiana, Green was raised in Orlando, Florida, before attending boarding school outside of Birmingham, Alabama. He attended Kenyon College, graduating with a double major in English and religious studies in 2000. Green then spent six months as a student chaplain at a children's hospital. He reconsidered his path and began working at Booklist in Chicago while writing his first novel. His debut novel Looking for Alaska (2005) was awarded the 2006 Michael L. Printz Award. While living in New York City, Green published his second novel, An Abundance of Katherines (2006). Starting on January 1, 2007, John and his brother Hank launched the Vlogbrothers YouTube channel, a series of vlogs submitted to one another on alternating weekdays; the videos spawned an active online-based community called Nerdfighteria and an annual telethon-style fundraiser called Project for Awesome, both of which have persisted and grown over time.

John moved back to Indianapolis in 2007, and published three novels over the next three years: Let It Snow: Three Holiday Romances (2008, with Maureen Johnson and Lauren Myracle); his third solo novel, Paper Towns (2008); and Will Grayson, Will Grayson (2010, with David Levithan). From 2010 to 2013, John and Hank launched several online video projects, including VidCon, an annual conference for the online video community, and Crash Course (2012–present), a wide-ranging educational channel. Green's 2012 novel, The Fault in Our Stars, and the 2014 film adaptation were massive commercial and critical successes, leading to several other film and television adaptations of his work. He was included in Time magazine's 2014 list of the 100 most influential people in the world.

Green's subsequent projects, his novel Turtles All the Way Down (2017) and The Anthropocene Reviewed (2018–2021), dealt more directly with his anxiety and obsessive–compulsive disorder. The Anthropocene Reviewed began as a podcast in January 2018, with Green reviewing different facets of the Anthropocene on a five-star scale. He adapted the podcast into his first nonfiction book in 2021.

Since the mid-2010s, John Green has been a prominent advocate for global health causes: he is a trustee for Partners In Health (PIH), supporting their goal of reducing maternal mortality in Sierra Leone, and has worked with PIH and a number of organizations in fighting tuberculosis worldwide. Green's second nonfiction book, Everything Is Tuberculosis, was released in March 2025. Green's first novel intended for adults, titled Hollywood, Ending, was released in September 2026.

== Early life and education ==
John Michael Green was born on August 24, 1977, in Indianapolis, Indiana, to Mike and Sydney Green. Within two months of his birth, his family moved to Michigan, then later Birmingham, Alabama, and finally to Orlando, Florida. There he attended Glenridge Middle School and Lake Highland Preparatory School. Green's father worked as the state director of The Nature Conservancy in Michigan and Florida, and his mother, after being a stay-at-home mother, worked for a nonprofit called the Healthy Community Initiative. When he was 15, he started attending Indian Springs School outside of Birmingham, Alabama, graduating in 1995. While attending the preparatory school, Green became good friends with Daniel Alarcón, who would go on to become an author as well. Green's future wife Sarah Urist also attended Indian Springs at the same time as Green, though they did not become friends until they became reacquainted in the early 2000s.

Green has characterized his upbringing by saying that "although he had a happy childhood, [...] he was not always a happy child." Green has struggled with severe anxiety and obsessive–compulsive disorder his whole life. He has also spoken about being bullied during high school and how it made life as a teenager miserable for him.

Green enrolled at Kenyon College in Gambier, Ohio, in 1995, graduating with a double major in English and religious studies in 2000. While attending the school, he befriended and was in a comedy troupe with Ransom Riggs. After graduation, Green spent about half a year working as a student chaplain at Nationwide Children's Hospital in Columbus, Ohio, while enrolled at the University of Chicago Divinity School, although he never actually attended the school. He intended to become an Episcopal priest, but the traumatic experiences of working in a hospital with children suffering from life-threatening illnesses and injuries made him reconsider his path. Parts of his experience inspired him to become an author, and later to write The Fault in Our Stars. After his time as a chaplain, Green moved to Chicago where he briefly continued performing with his college comedy troupe.

== Career ==
=== Early career and novels (2001–2006) ===
==== Booklist magazine and Looking for Alaska ====
In 2001, Green was hired as an editorial assistant at the book review journal Booklist, later becoming a production editor. While there he reviewed hundreds of books, particularly on literary fiction, Islam, boxing, and conjoined twins. He also wrote radio essays for NPR's All Things Considered and Chicago's public radio station WBEZ. He wrote essays for WBEZ after beginning an email correspondence with Amy Krouse Rosenthal, who became a close friend and mentor.

While working at Booklist, Green met author Ilene Cooper, whose example persuaded him he could write a novel, saying, "I saw that real people like Ilene wrote books; they weren't written in ivory towers." Cooper invited Green to lunch to discuss his future. She set a deadline for Green to present her with a draft of his first book, which Green failed to present to her twice over. Near the end of 2001, Green suffered from a mental health crisis so severe he could not eat, and instead drank only two-liter bottles of Sprite. He lived with his parents for a brief time while seeing a psychiatrist and going on medication. When he returned to Chicago, he began writing Looking for Alaska. Green wrote the novel divided into "before" and "after" the character Alaska's death, with chapters denoted through the number of days before or after the death. The structure was partially inspired by Green's reaction to the terrorist attacks of September 11, 2001, months prior, and its status as a dividing line in history and in people's lives.

Green presented the first draft to Cooper, who served as a mentor through the following two versions. Cooper sent the third draft to Dutton Children's Books in early 2003, which awarded Green with a publishing contract and a small four-figure book deal. Looking for Alaska was assigned to editor Julie Strauss-Gabel, which began their collaboration that has persisted through all of Green's books. In a 2015 interview with The New York Times, Green reflected, "In a publishing world that maybe doesn't have as many long-term relationships as it used to, she invested a lot of time in me before I ever earned a profit. I've never written a book without Julie. I wouldn't know how to do it."

Looking for Alaska was published in March 2005. The novel is a coming-of-age school story and teen romance about a boarding school student who gets bullied, partially inspired by Green's experiences at Indian Springs, Alabama, fictionalized as Culver Creek Preparatory High School. The novel was well-received critically, but initially saw only modest sales. The novel was awarded the annual Michael L. Printz Award by the American Library Association (ALA), recognizing the year's "best book written for teens, based entirely on its literary merit". Receiving the award caused book sales to rapidly rise, with Green describing his reaction upon hearing he had won the award as, "probably the purest moment of joy I've experienced. Even when my children were born it wasn't as raw and surprising." It also appeared on the ALA's annual "Top 10 Best Books for Young Adults" and appeared on the New York Times Best Seller list seven years later during a surge in Green's popularity after the release of The Fault in Our Stars. Green left his job at Booklist after receiving the Printz Award.

==== An Abundance of Katherines ====
Green moved to the Upper West Side in New York City in 2005 while his then-fiancée Sarah Urist attended graduate school at Columbia University. He worked at Mental Floss magazine while he continued his second novel, having already finished a first draft while living in Chicago. He co-authored several Mental Floss gift books while there, including Cocktail Party Cheat Sheets, What's the Difference? and Scatterbrained. He also critiqued books for The New York Times Book Review.

His second novel, An Abundance of Katherines, was released in September 2006. Set in Chicago, the novel is about an extremely intelligent but depressed 17-year-old boy who is constantly dating (and being dumped by) girls named Katherine. Reviewers noted that the book's tone was significantly more comedic and light than Looking for Alaska. It was runner-up for the Printz Award, and a finalist for the Los Angeles Times Book Prize. Green began writing his third solo novel while still living in New York.

=== Online and literary collaborations (2007–2011) ===
==== Paper Towns and collaborative works ====
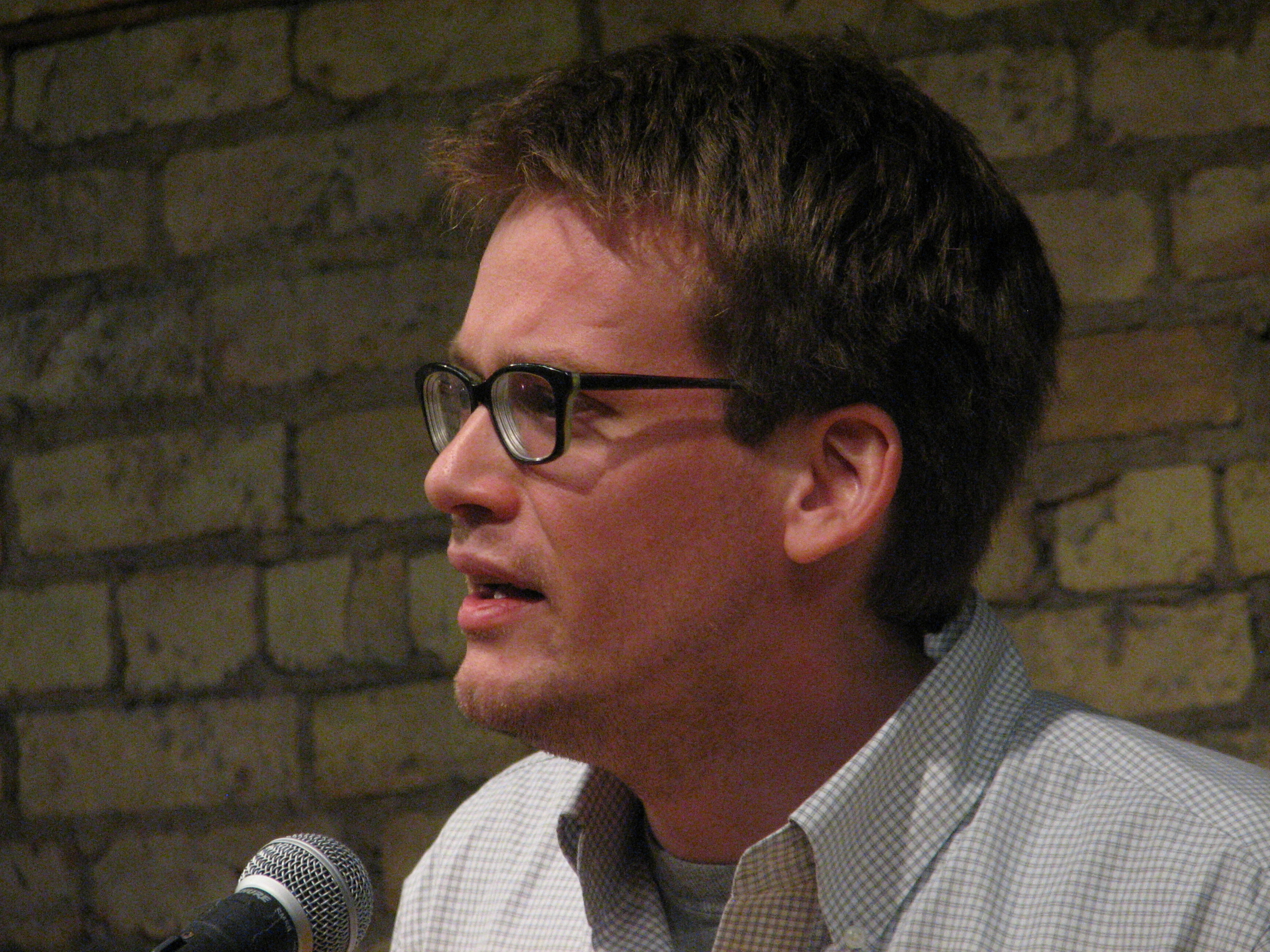
Green at The Loft Literary Center, Minneapolis, in 2008

Green moved back to Indianapolis in June 2007 when Sarah began a position as a curator of contemporary art at the Indianapolis Museum of Art. In an interview in October 2007, Green mentioned that his next solo novel's working title was Paper Towns.

Green's next novel was a collaboration with fellow young adult authors Maureen Johnson and Lauren Myracle titled Let It Snow: Three Holiday Romances, released in September 2008. The book consists of three interconnected short stories, including Green's "A Cheertastic Christmas Miracle", with each set in the same small town on Christmas Eve during a massive snowstorm. In November 2009, the book reached number ten on The New York Times Best Seller list for paperback children's books.

Green's third solo novel, Paper Towns, was released in October 2008. Set in the suburbs of Orlando, Florida, the book is about the coming-of-age of the protagonist, Quentin "Q" Jacobsen, and his search for Margo Roth Spiegelman, his neighbor and childhood sweetheart. The story has often been described as a deconstruction of the "Manic Pixie Dream Girl" trope, including by Green himself. It debuted at number five on The New York Times Best Seller list for children's books. Paper Towns was awarded the 2009 Edgar Allan Poe Award for Best Young Adult Novel and the 2010 Corine Literature Prize.

After this, Green and fellow young-adult writer David Levithan collaborated on the novel Will Grayson, Will Grayson, which Dutton published in April 2010. Set in the suburbs of Chicago, the book's narrative is divided evenly between two boys named Will Grayson; Green wrote the odd chapters on the Will Grayson who is straight, and Levithan wrote the even chapters on the Will Grayson who is gay. The novel debuted on The New York Times children's best-seller list after its release and remained there for three weeks. It was the first LGBT-themed young adult novel to make it to the list. It was a runner-up for two of the annual ALA awards: the Stonewall Book Award for excellence in LGBT children's and young adult literature, and the Odyssey Award for Excellence in Audiobook Production.

==== Online video beginnings ====
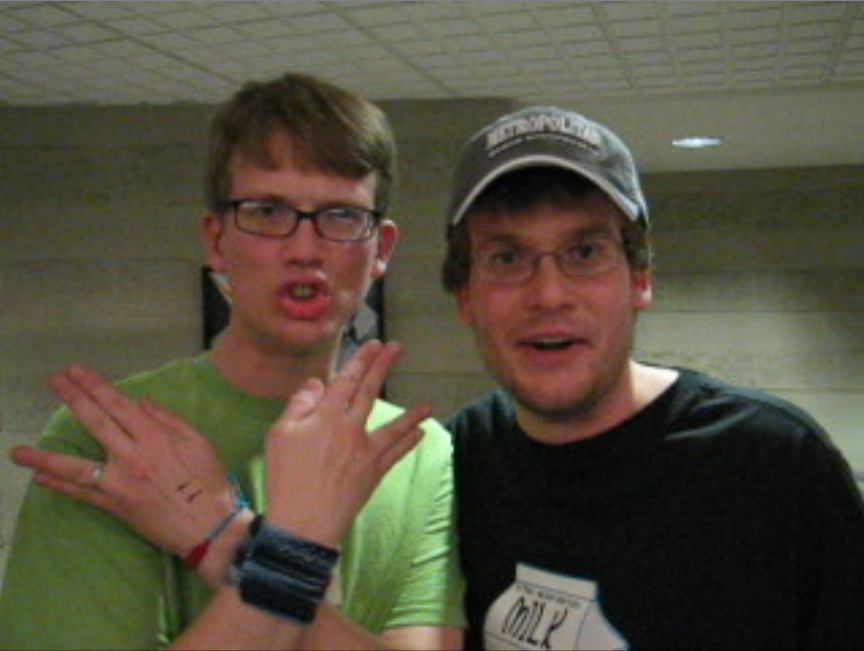
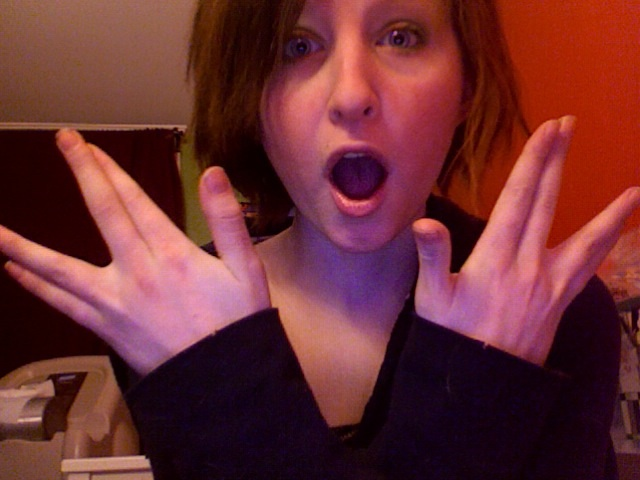
(From left to right) The Vlogbrothers in 2008 and Esther Earl, with Hank and Earl performing the "Nerdfighter salute"

In 2007, John and his brother Hank began a video blog project called Brotherhood 2.0 which ran from January 1 to December 31 of that year and was published to their YouTube channel "Vlogbrothers". The two agreed that they would forgo all text-based communication for the project's duration and instead maintain their relationship by exchanging these vlogs. Each submitted one to the other on alternating weekdays. The brothers gained a large following during the early years of YouTube, especially after Hank's video "Accio Deathly Hallows" was featured on the front page of YouTube. In what would have been the project's final video, the brothers revealed that they would extend their video correspondence indefinitely. As of July 2026, they have continued exchanging their vlogs and the channel has over 4.1 million subscribers and 1 billion views.

Since the project's inception, the duo has gained a wide-reaching international fanbase whose members identify collectively as "Nerdfighters". One prominent early Nerdfighter was Esther Earl, who developed a bond with the Green brothers and the Nerdfighter community before she died in 2010 at the age of sixteen of thyroid cancer. Green and the Nerdfighteria community continue to celebrate "Esther Day" each year on August 3, and support the non-profit foundation This Star Won't Go Out, founded by Esther's parents Wayne and Lori Earl. Green wrote the introduction to Earl's biography and has stated that Earl was an inspiration for the main character Hazel in The Fault in Our Stars.

The group, in collaboration with the two brothers, promote and participate in several other humanitarian efforts and community events, including loaning more than $4 million through Kiva.org, as well as the Project for Awesome (P4A). The Project for Awesome is an annual telethon-style fundraiser begun in 2007. The event includes a 48-hour livestream in which charities are voted on by the community while supporters pledge money and receive donated perks, such as artwork or digital content. The livestream is hosted by the Greens and other YouTube personalities, including Destin Sandlin and Phil Plait. The event has continued annually, gaining support and higher donations over time, raising over $3 million in 2023 and over $3.5 million in 2024.

Hank Green and Alan Lastufka co-founded DFTBA Records (an initialism for "Don't Forget to Be Awesome") in 2008, with John Green later becoming a co-owner. Originally a record label, its main focus was music generated by prominent YouTube stars. The company now focuses on selling merchandise.

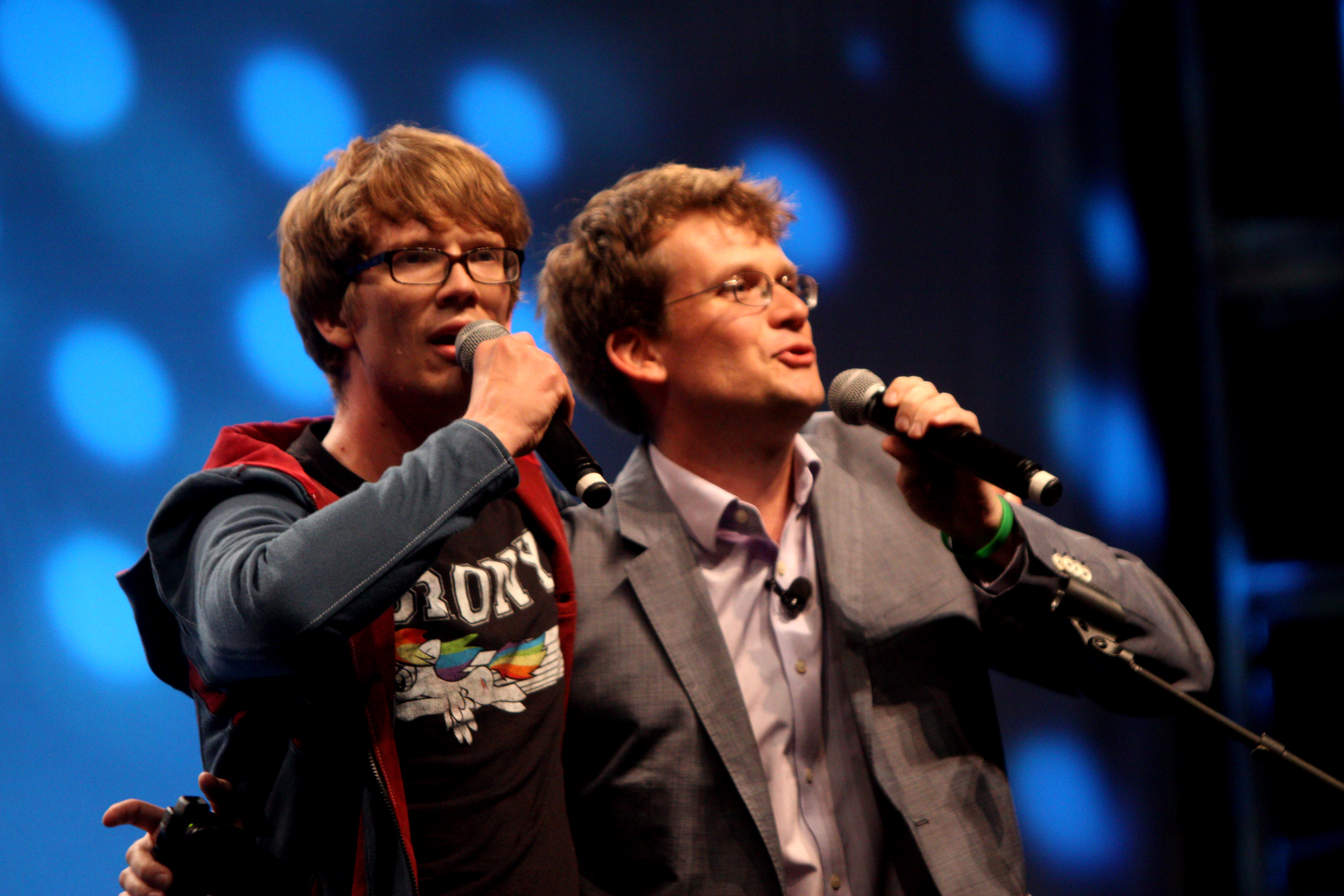
John and Hank Green at Vidcon 2012

In 2010, the brothers launched VidCon as a conference for the online video community. The Greens created the conference in response to the growing YouTube community. Hank stated, "We wanted to get as much of the online video community together, in one place, in the real world for a weekend. It's a celebration of the community, with performances, concerts, and parties, but it's also a discussion of the explosion in community-based online video." The event drew many popular YouTubers, as well as their fans, and provided room for the community to interact. The event also contained an industry conference for people and businesses working in the online video field. The convention was a success, leading to it becoming an annual event that was acquired by Viacom in 2018.

=== Breakout success (2012–2016) ===
==== The Fault in Our Stars and adaptations ====
Green had announced in August 2009 he was writing a new book titled The Sequel. The work was later scrapped, with parts integrated into his next book, The Fault in Our Stars, released on January 10, 2012. Green's fourth solo novel, the story is about Hazel Grace Lancaster, a 16-year-old girl living in Indianapolis, Indiana, who has thyroid cancer. She is forced by her parents to attend a support group where she meets and falls in love with 17-year-old Augustus Waters, an ex-basketball player, amputee, and survivor of osteosarcoma. Green was inspired by his friendship with Esther Earl, as well as his time working as a student chaplain in a children's hospital. In an interview with The Atlantic in 2013, he stated, "The kids I met [while working as a student chaplain] were funny and bright and angry and dark and just as human as anybody else. And I really wanted to try to capture that. I felt that the stories that I was reading sort of oversimplified and sometimes even dehumanized them. [...] I wanted to argue for their humanity, their complete humanity." He crafted the novel in collaboration with his long-time editor Julie Strauss-Gabel. Green signed all 150,000 copies of the first printing.

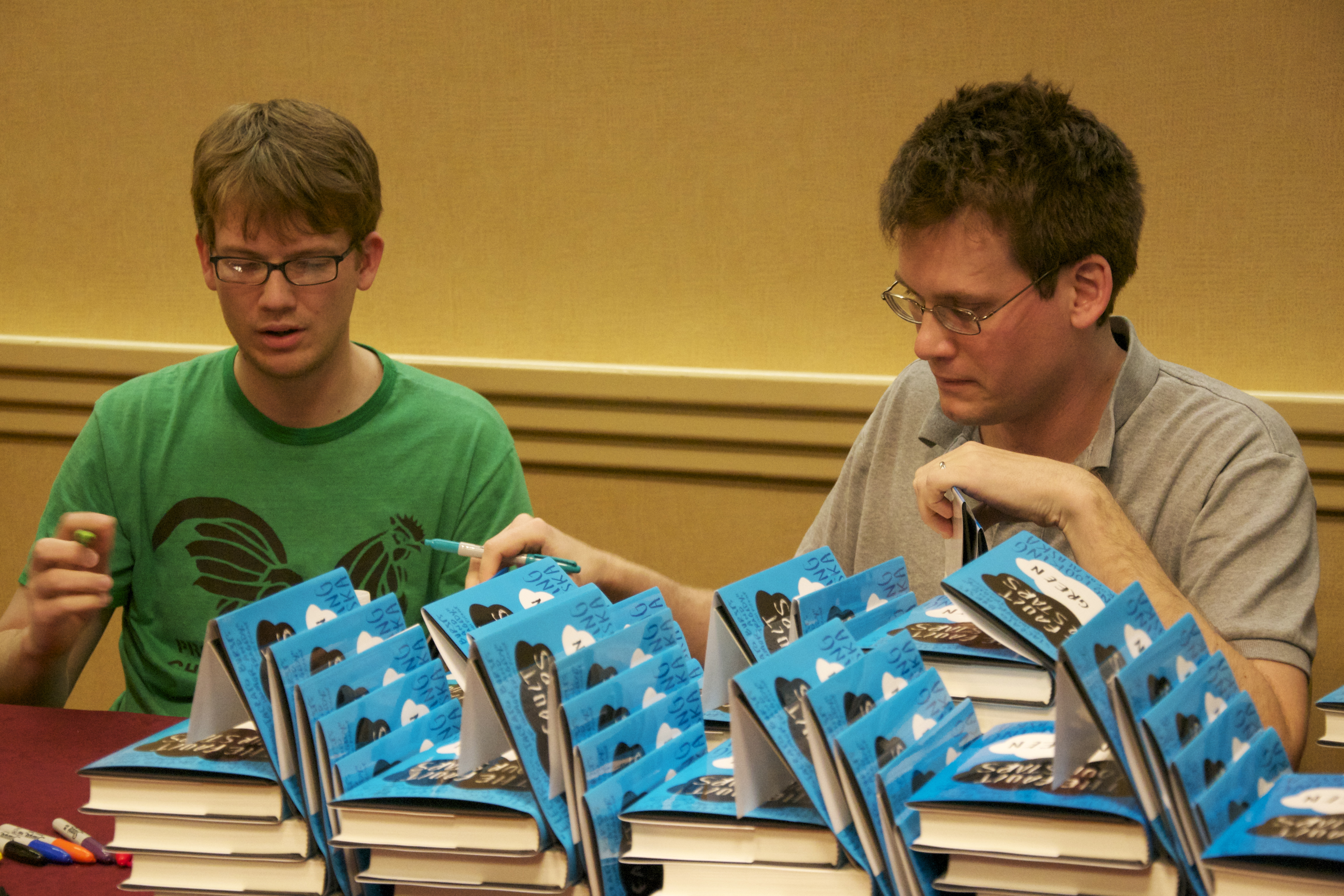
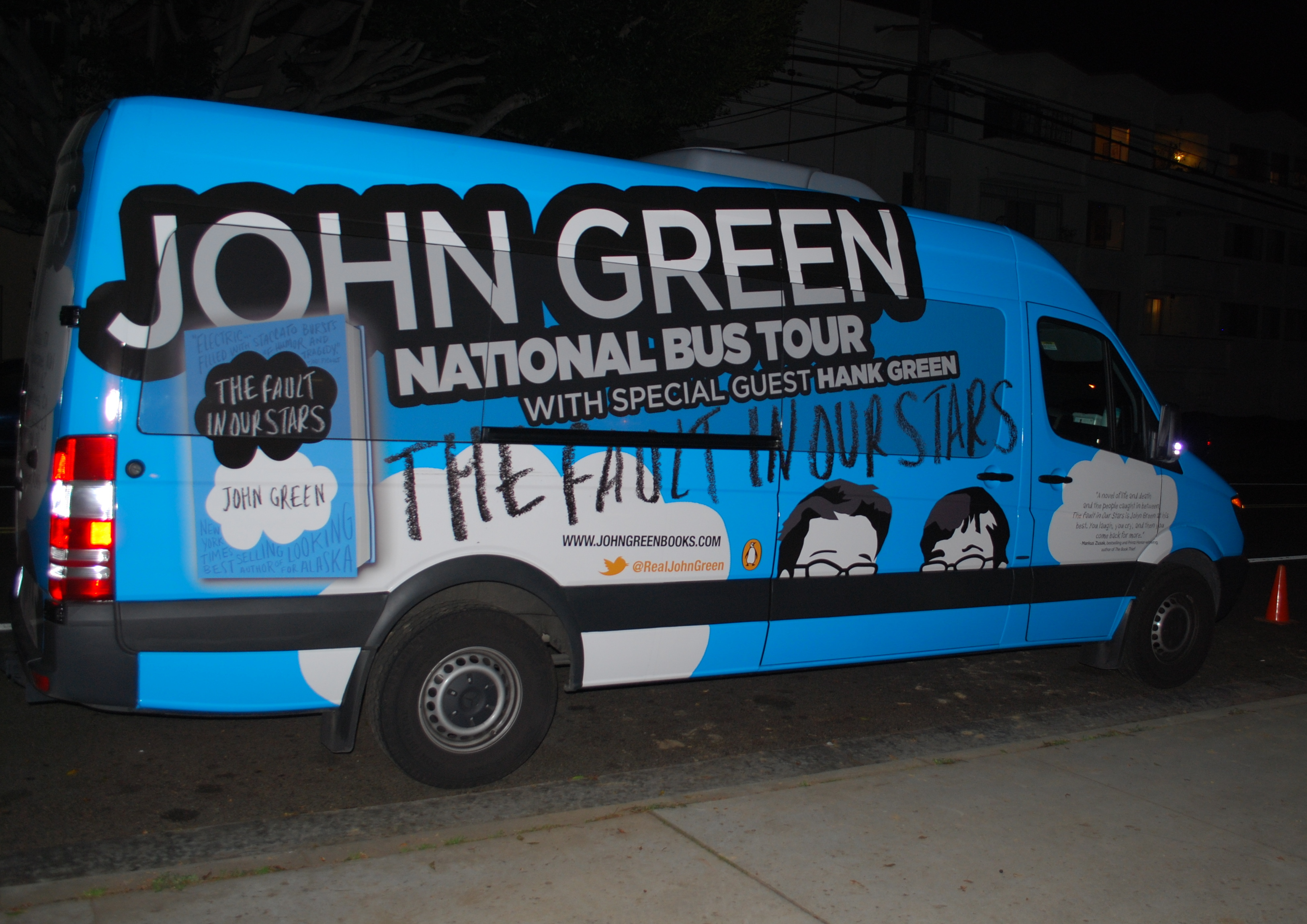
(Above) John and Hank Green signing copies of The Fault in Our Stars in January 2012, and (Below) a van decorated for the book tour.

The Fault in Our Stars was massively successful, creating a passionate fan base of readers. Six months before the release of the book, before it had even been finished, online pre-orders led to the book being a number one seller on Amazon.com and Barnes & Noble. After release, the book debuted at number one on The New York Times Best Seller list for children's chapter books. It went on to spend forty-three total weeks at the number one spot and over two years in the top ten.

Green himself also saw a significant increase in his fame, with the Indianapolis Business Journal noting that he had much more "visibility and presence in his fans' lives" than other contemporaneous authors with equal or greater book sales. Upon the book's release, Green began a 17-city book tour, visiting largely sold-out venues across the country. On the first anniversary of its release, John and his brother Hank performed a sold-out show at Carnegie Hall's Isaac Stern Auditorium in New York City, which also featured appearances from Neil Gaiman and The Mountain Goats. Green appeared on The Late Late Show with Craig Ferguson in March 2013. Green stated his anxiety leading up to the television interview prevented him from getting work done for weeks before.

In late 2013, Green stated that he was writing a new book with the working title The Racket. He sold 5,000 words of a rough draft of the work during that years Project for Awesome. That same year, Green hired long-time Nerdfighter Rosianna Halse Rojas as his executive assistant.

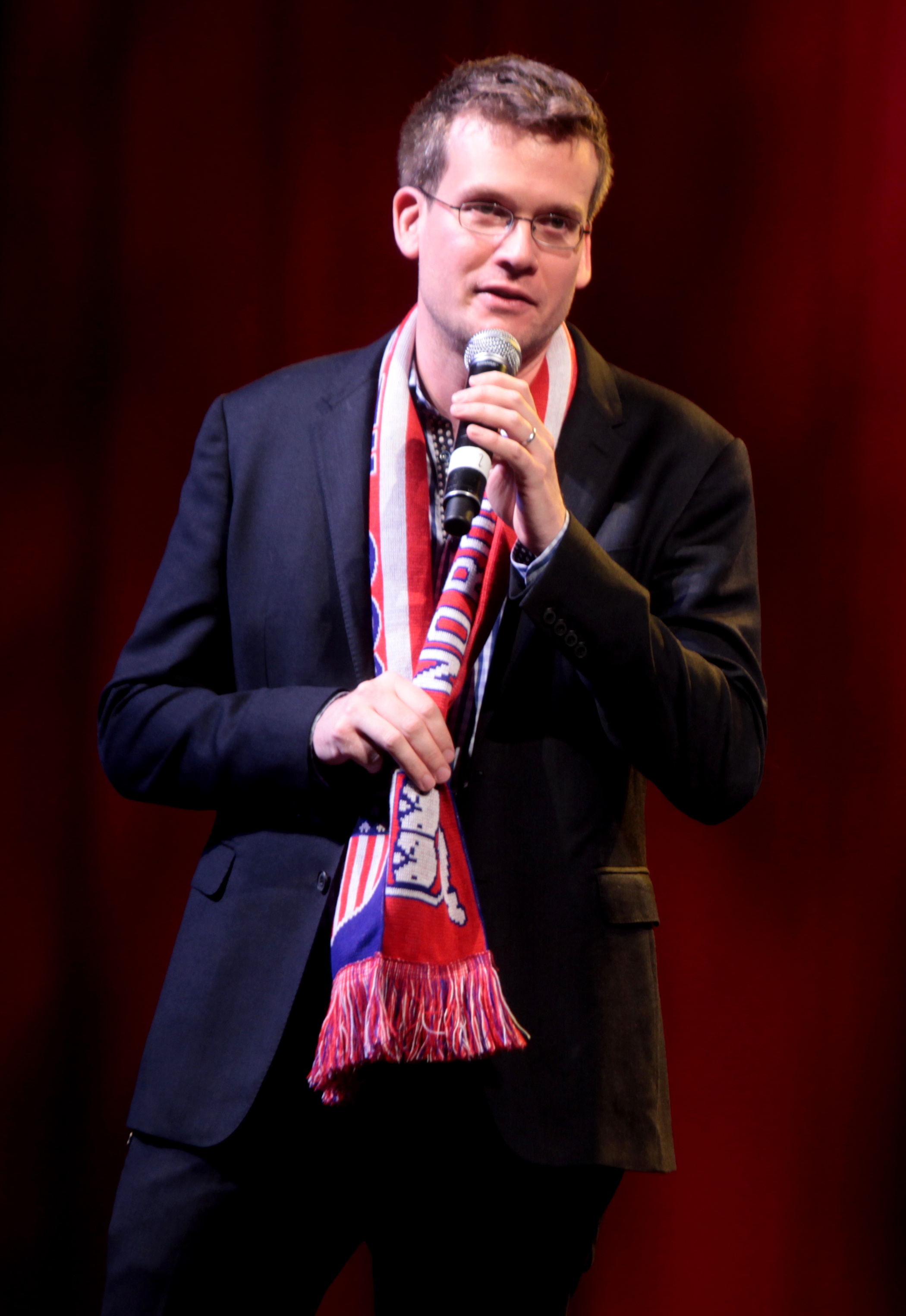
Green at Vidcon in 2014

A film adaptation of The Fault in Our Stars was green-lit within three weeks of the book's release. Green had initially been hesitant to sell the movie rights for the book, saying, "I'd had some unhappy experiences before, and I didn't want a movie I didn't like being made from a book that's so important to me. This book frankly is more important to me than my other books." To that end, Green was involved in the movie's pre-production, and was on set for most of the film's shooting. The Hollywood Reporter stated in May 2014 that even before the movie's release, its expected success was causing a shift in the types of films being made for teenagers, with Pouya Shahbazian, the producer of the dystopian science fiction film Divergent, stating, "I've already had calls from studio execs who want to be on the list for small, intimate stories that previously would have been impossible to sell to their senior execs. Who would have believed a small-budget, YA teenage cancer love story would have rival studio execs calling it a potential event movie?" Additionally, the magazine reported that the film studio behind the movie, Fox 2000, would consider anything over $125 million in box office earnings a huge success.

On June 6, 2014, The Fault in Our Stars film was released, the first adaptation of one of Green's novels. The film was massively successful, opening number one at the box office and grossing $307 million worldwide against a budget of $12 million. Green filmed a cameo role for the movie that was not included in the final cut of the film. The profound success of the book and the movie further launched Green into mainstream culture, an experience he found emotionally fraught. Green appeared on The Colbert Report to promote the movie's release in June 2014. Green was included in Time magazine's 2014 Time 100 list of the 100 most influential people in the world. The trade paperback version of The Fault in Our Stars was the top selling novel of the year on Publishers Weekly's annual list.

Just over a year after the first film's release, an adaptation of Paper Towns was released, starring Cara Delevingne and Nat Wolff. Green served as an executive producer for the movie and entered into a first-look production deal with the studio behind the film, Fox 2000, alongside his now producing partner Rojas. In 2016, Green announced that Fox 2000 would be making a movie about the formation of AFC Wimbledon, a soccer team that he supports, and he would serve as a producer. As of 2022, the movie has not been produced.

==== Focus on educational content ====
As part of the platform's "YouTube Original Channel Initiative", YouTube approached John and Hank with an opportunity to start a Google-funded channel. YouTube gave the brothers $450,000, which they used to launch the Crash Course YouTube channel. The channel was launched in January 2012, with the first episode of its World History series hosted by John Green. The channel has since grown to over 50 series covering topics including history, literature, and science. All of the content is available for free and many follow the curricula for the Advanced Placement program. John has hosted several of the series, including the first on world history, which he co-wrote with his high school history teacher, Raoul Meyer.

After two years of producing Crash Course and Hank's science-related channel SciShow through the grants provided by YouTube, the Green brothers sought a more sustainable way to fund the projects. In 2013, they launched Subbable, a subscription-based crowdfunding platform that would enable donors to pledge a monthly sum to creators and receive perks in exchange. Among the platform's creators and channels were the Green brothers' Crash Course and SciShow, and YouTubers CGP Grey, MinutePhysics and Wheezy Waiter. The platform went on to be acquired by fellow subscription-based crowdfunding platform Patreon in March 2015. Patreon added Subbable's creators into its fold and the Green brothers became advisors at Patreon.

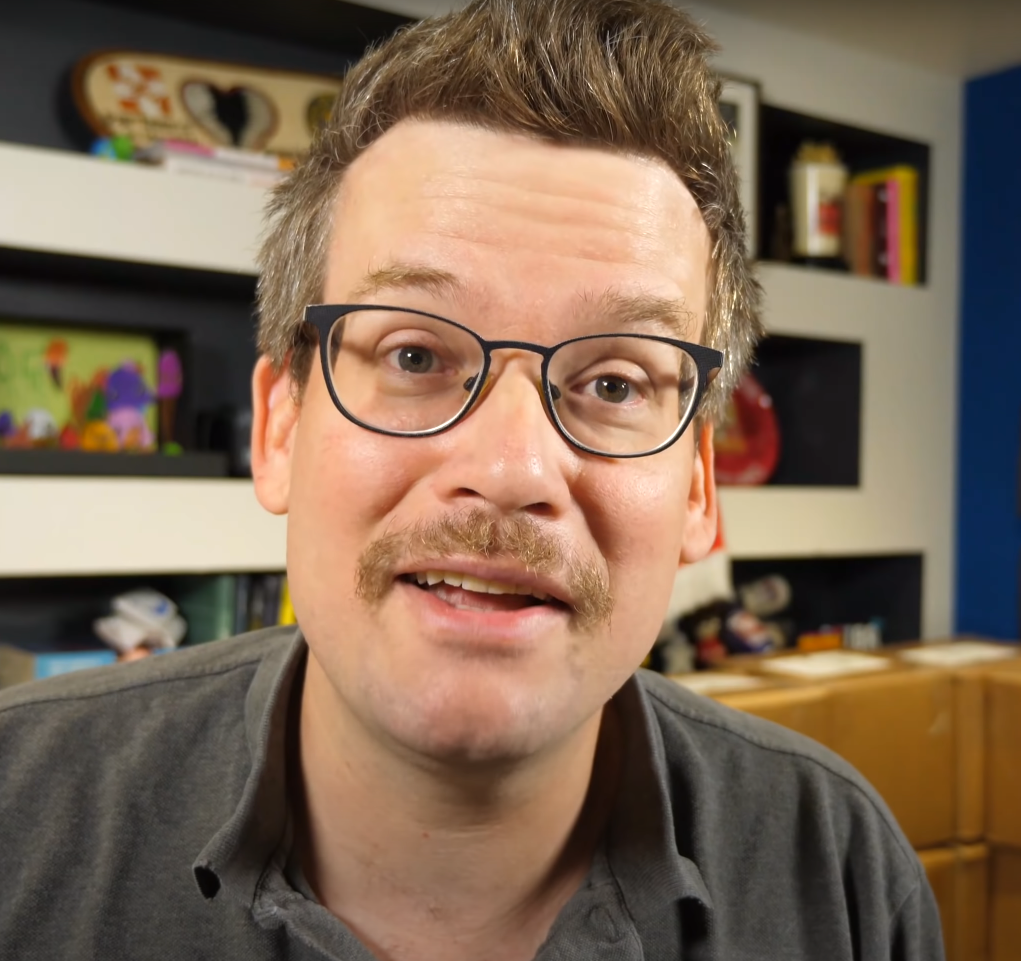
John Green sporting a mustache during "Pizzamas" in 2020

Starting in 2012 and 2013, John and Hank began celebrating an event called "Pizzamas" in which they sold merchandise, including t-shirts, featuring "Pizza John": a white outlined image of John sporting a thick mustache, originating from a 2009 Vlogbrothers video that then became a popular meme in the Nerdfighteria community. Starting in 2014, John and Hank began uploading videos to Vlogbrothers every weekday for two weeks during Pizzamas, and began selling more varied merchandise, including fan art of Pizza John printed on blankets, tote bags, and pizza-scented air fresheners. All the proceeds are donated to various charities, including Partners In Health.

From 2013 to 2018, Green was one of the hosts of the YouTube channel for the magazine Mental Floss, for whom he had worked when in New York. Green presented "The List Show" in which he listed off interesting facts centered on one particular subject. These episodes were directed by Mark Olsen and produced by John and Hank Green and Stan Muller. A new format, titled Scatterbrained, named after one of the books he had written for Mental Floss, was introduced on the channel in 2018; Green was joined by multiple hosts on a single episode each week, which tackled one topic from multiple angles. In 2019, Mental Floss brought its YouTube production in-house and ceased using Green as a host.

On February 20, 2014, Sarah Urist Green launched The Art Assignment, a PBS and Complexly video series. John served as an executive producer for the series. In September 2019, Sarah Urist Green, in collaboration with John and the Poetry Foundation, launched the YouTube channel Ours Poetica.

In June 2015, John Green and his brother Hank started a weekly podcast titled Dear Hank & John. Taking a mainly humorous tone, each podcast consists of the brothers reading a series of questions submitted by listeners and offering their "dubious" advice. The podcast closes with a news segment with two standard topics: Mars, presented by Hank, and AFC Wimbledon, presented by John.

EcoGeek LLC, a company founded by Hank Green to support his blog on environmental and science issues in the early 2000s, was renamed to Complexly in 2016. Complexly became the umbrella video and audio production company which produces and manages most of the Green brothers' YouTube shows, as well as a number of other shows, podcasts, and projects. John serves as the co-founder and strategic advisor for the company.

==== Appearances ====
Green gave commencement speeches at Butler University in 2013 and at his alma mater Kenyon College in May 2016. Both universities conferred Honorary Doctorates of Letters on him.

A video by John Green documenting his experience at the World Economic Forum, originally posted on Vlogbrothers

In January 2016, Green was named to the Forum of Young Global Leaders by the World Economic Forum (WEF). He attended the annual meeting of the WEF in Davos, Switzerland, that year. In February 2016, Green visited Jordan to meet with Syrian refugees with the United Nations Human Rights Council (UNHRC). Green has often acted as an advocate for refugees, stating that "for those of you who share my faith, Jesus is awfully unambiguous about the poor, shelterless, and imprisoned".

=== Established author and internet personality (2017–2022) ===
==== Turtles All the Way Down ====
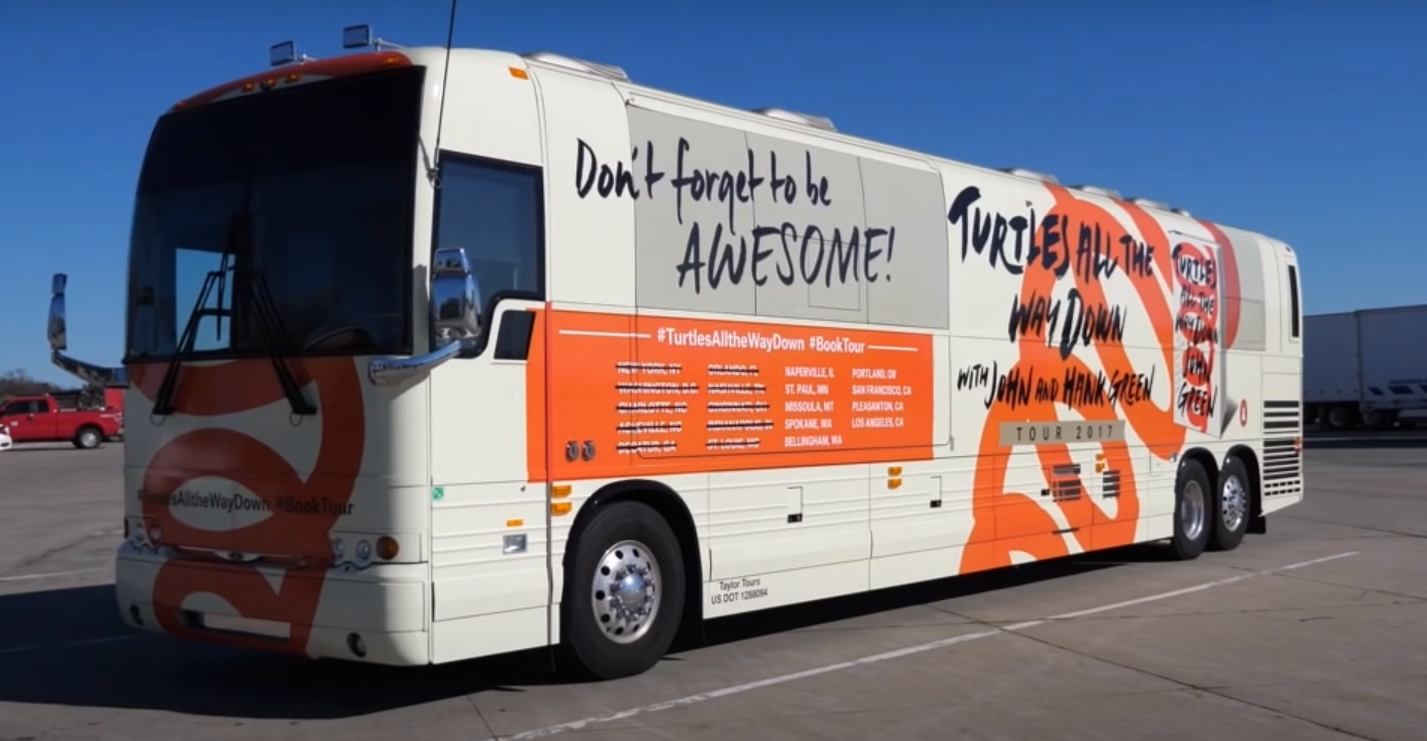
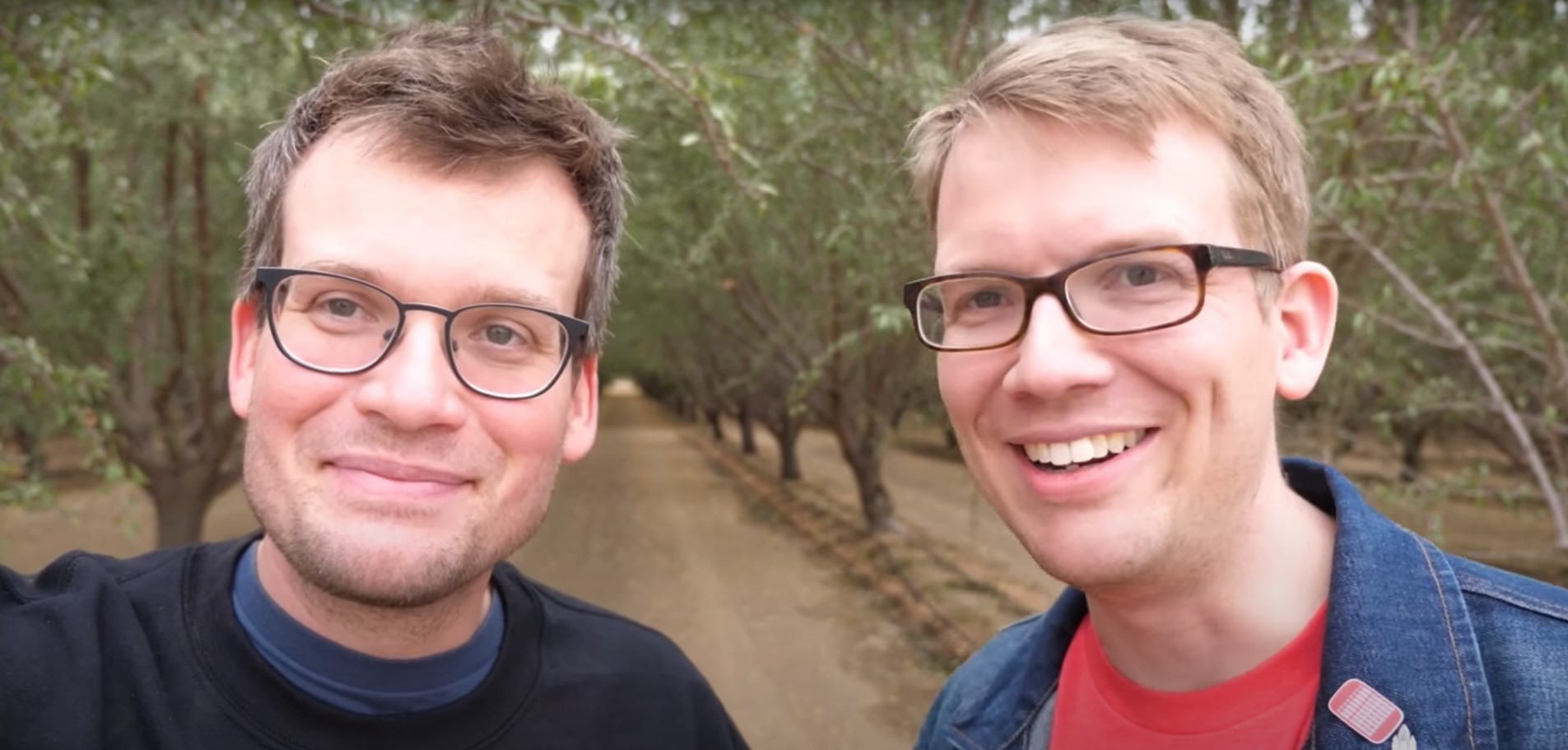
John and Hank Green and their tour bus during the 2017 book tour for Turtles All The Way Down

In November 2014, amidst the intense success of The Fault in Our Stars, Green wrote on his Tumblr page that he was not working on his previously announced next project, The Racket, anymore, but was working on something else with a different title. In September 2015, Green announced that he would be taking a break from social media to focus on writing his next book. Around this time, Green experienced a period of severe anxiety, partly due to the perceived burden to follow up the massive success of The Fault in Our Stars. He worried he might never write another book. He stopped taking his prescribed medications hoping to reinvigorate his creativity and his mental health suffered, with him later describing the experience saying, "I can't think straight—I can only think in swirls and scribbles." After he recovered in late 2015, he began writing Turtles All the Way Down.

In August 2016, Green stated that over the next ten months he would be limiting his public appearances in order to finish a draft of the new book. But on September 20, Green took to his YouTube channel to say that he may never publish another book, citing his current writing experience as, "this intense pressure, like people were watching over my shoulder while I was writing". He eventually submitted a draft to his editor Strauss-Gabel, and they worked on the book together for another year.

On June 22, 2017, it was announced that Green's fifth solo novel would be titled Turtles All the Way Down. It was released on October 10, 2017, and debuted at number one on the New York Times bestseller list. The story centers on 16-year-old Aza Holmes, an Indianapolis high school student with obsessive–compulsive disorder and anxiety, and her search for a fugitive billionaire as she begins a relationship with that billionaire's son. Speaking about the novel, Green said, "This is my first attempt to write directly about the kind of mental illness that has affected my life since childhood, so while the story is fictional, it is also quite personal." Like his previous books, Green signed the first 200,000 copies of the book, as part of the initial run of 1.5 million copies.

Upon the release of his book, he and his brother Hank went on a book tour. In May 2018, Green was interviewed by then-quarterback for the Indianapolis Colts, Andrew Luck, after Turtles All the Way Down was named a selection for the Andrew Luck Book Club. They discussed the book and their relationships with anxiety and stress for the event that promoted the PBS series The Great American Read.

==== The Anthropocene Reviewed ====
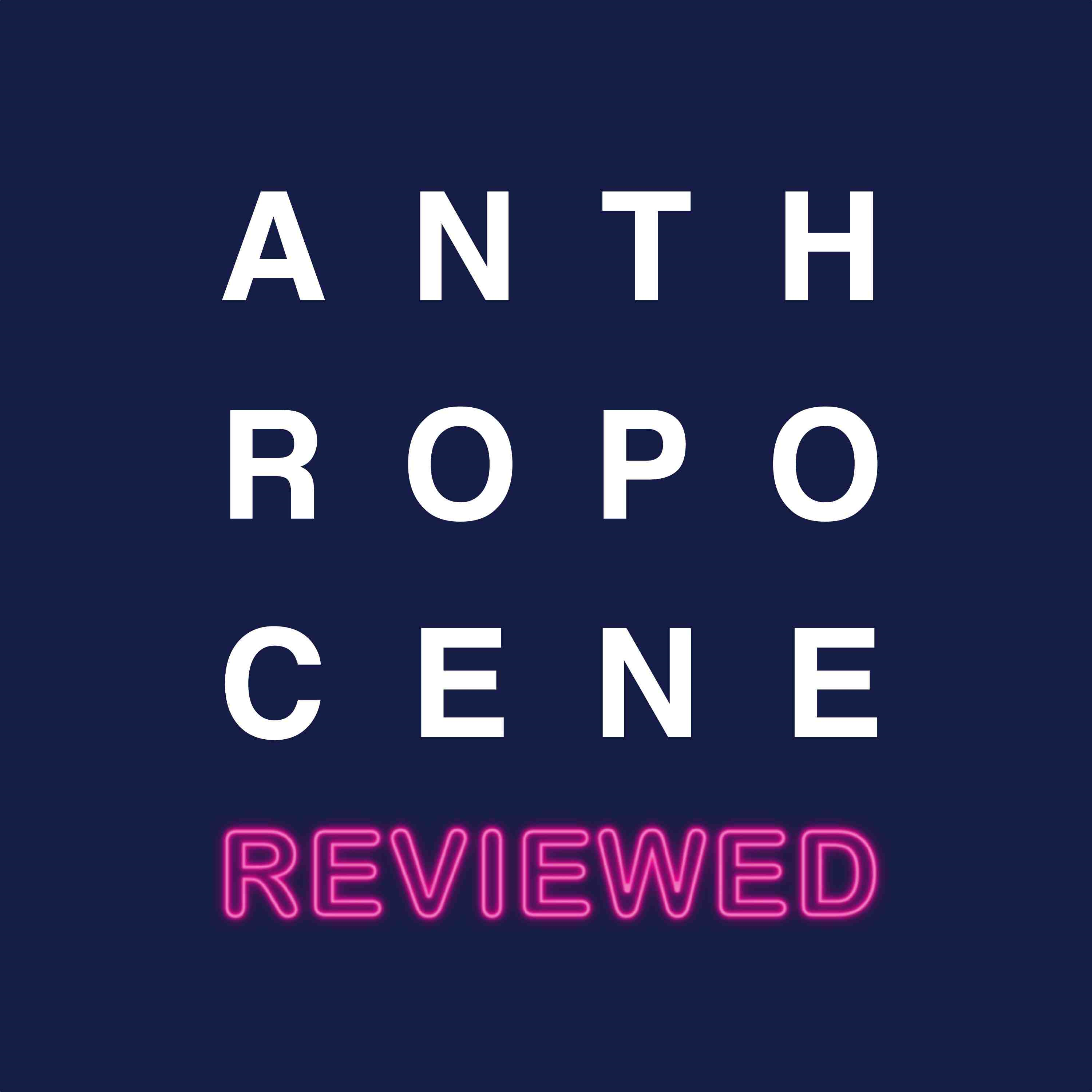
- Logo for the podcast The Anthropocene Reviewed
- Auld Lang Syne – The Anthropocene Reviewed The 23rd episode of the podcast, reviewing "Auld Lang Syne"

In January 2018, Green launched The Anthropocene Reviewed, a solo podcast where he reviews different facets of the Anthropocene, the epoch that includes significant human impact on the environment, on a five-star scale. This can include completely artificial products like Diet Dr. Pepper, natural species that have had their fates altered by human influence like the Canada goose, or phenomena that influence only humanity such as Halley's Comet. Episodes typically contained Green reviewing two topics, accompanied by stories on how they have impacted his life. At the end of 2018, the Green brothers partnered with WNYC Studios to bring all of their podcasts, including The Anthropocene Reviewed, to the distributor.

Green adapted the essays into a book, The Anthropocene Reviewed: Essays on a Human-Centered Planet, which was published by Dutton Penguin on May 18, 2021. The book was Green's first nonfiction book and sixth solo publication. The book received positive reviews and debuted at number one on The New York Times Best Seller list. The book featured revised versions of many of the essays from the podcast, as well as new original essays, ordered chronologically through Green's life to give the book the approximate structure of a memoir. Green wrote about living through the COVID-19 pandemic in many of the essays. As he had done with many of his previous books, Green signed all 250,000 tip-in sheets of the first printing for the United States and Canada. He wrote a review of the experience on the final signed page. This review was later revised and expanded on for an episode of the podcast released on the same day as the book. Green subsequently ended the podcast in August 2021 after 36 episodes.

In May 2021, Green hosted a virtual book tour for The Anthropocene Reviewed, with guests Clint Smith, Latif Nasser, Sarah Urist Green, Hank Green, and Ashley C. Ford making appearances at the various shows. In April 2022, The Anthropocene Reviewed was chosen to be the 2022 common read at the University of Mississippi. Green gave a keynote address at the university's annual fall convocation.

==== Further adaptations ====
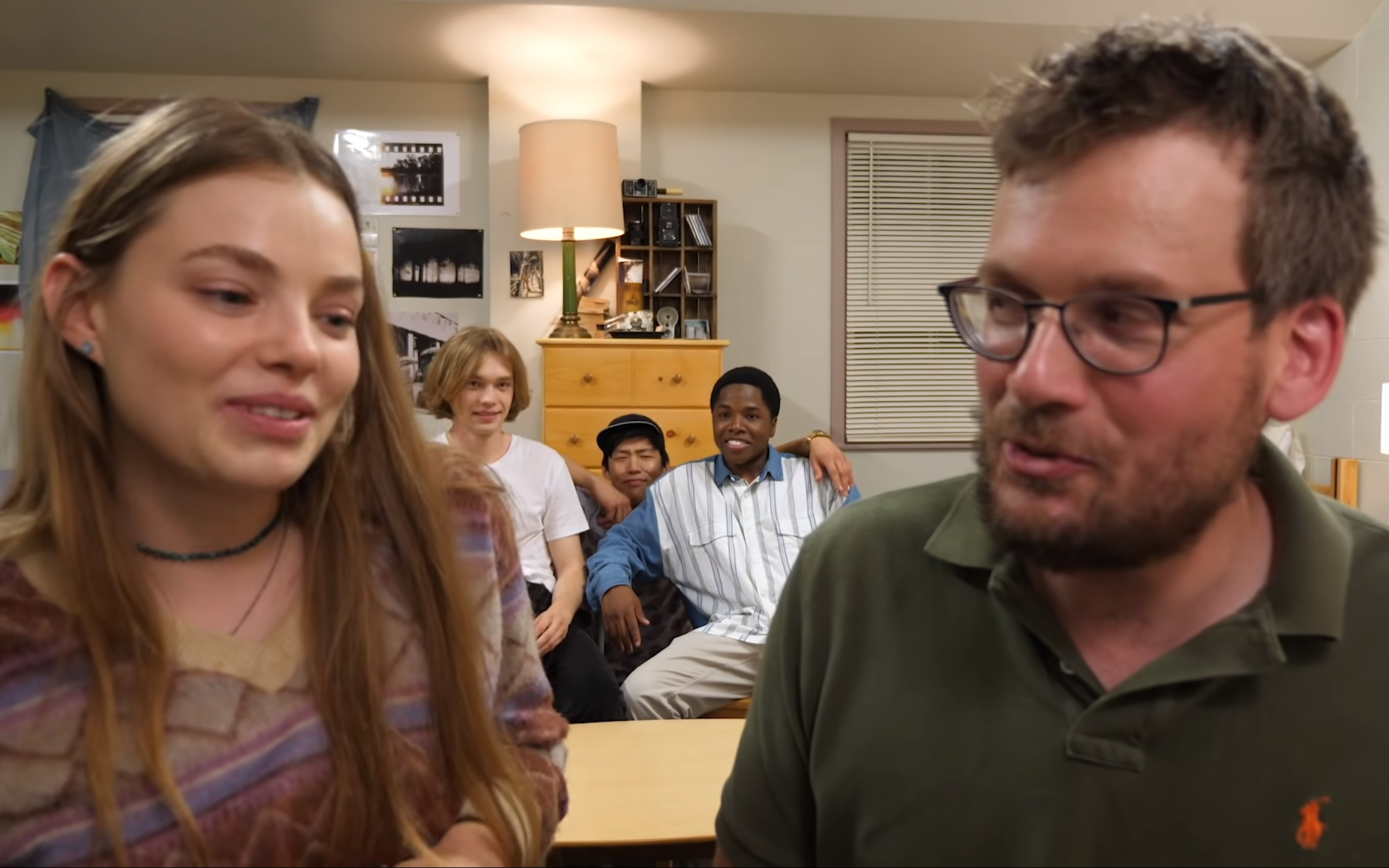
John Green with the cast of Looking for Alaska (left to right): Kristine Froseth, Charlie Plummer, Jay Lee, and Denny Love, on Vlogbrothers in 2019

Green had sold the film the rights for Looking for Alaska in 2005 to Paramount, which hired Josh Schwartz as writer and director. However, after five years with no progress on the project, Green told fans that, while he "desperately loved" the screenplay, there seemed to be little interest at Paramount. In 2012, the book reached The New York Times Best Seller list for children's paperbacks. Finally, in May 2018, it was announced that Looking for Alaska would be made into a Hulu series with Schwartz and others on board. The casting was announced in October 2018. Looking for Alaska was released to Hulu on October 18, 2019. The series was critically well-received, with Kathryn VanArendonk of Vulture calling it a "rare adaptation that dismantles the original in order to build something that works better".

In 2017, Green authorized a stage play adaptation of The Fault in Our Stars. The play was written by theatre director Tobin Strader of Brebeuf Jesuit Preparatory School in Indianapolis and four students at the high school. It was performed in 2019. In 2019, Let It Snow was adapted into a film of the same name by Netflix. On Metacritic, it has a weighted average score of 51 out of 100, based on reviews from five critics, indicating "mixed or average reviews".

In August 2014, India's Fox Star Studios announced it would adapt The Fault in Our Stars into an Indian Hindi-language film, with the working title of Kizie Aur Manny. The adaptation ages up the characters and changes the main setting to India. The title of the movie was later changed to Dil Bechara ("The Helpless Heart") and is named after one of the original songs written for the movie. Music composer A. R. Rahman composed the background music and songs of the movie. The film was scheduled to be released on May 8, 2020, after having been initially scheduled in November 2019, but was later postponed due to the COVID-19 pandemic in India. It was released on July 24, 2020, on Disney+ Hotstar and was met with mainly positive reviews.

The 2020 Chinese film A Little Red Flower has been noted for having significant similarities to The Fault in Our Stars, which was never theatrically released in China. A Chinese remake of The Fault in Our Stars had been in development by Fox International Productions in 2016. In 2018, a notice was released by the China Film Administration for a project with a similar premise and the same writers and producers to the original remake, and in 2020, A Little Red Flower was released with no credit given to Fox.

==== Partners In Health ====
Since the mid-2010s, John and Hank Green and their families have supported the international public health nonprofit Partners In Health (PIH). Beginning with the annual Project for Awesome fundraiser in 2013, Partners In Health received $50,000 as one of the community-chosen charities. The charity was first selected as one of the "designated charities" the following year, meaning Green and the other organizers had chosen for it to receive a large portion of the funds raised, totaling $291,000. It was again selected as a designated charity in 2016 before becoming a permanent designated charity in every iteration of the fundraiser since 2018.

In October 2018, Green founded the Life's Library book club with Rosianna Halse Rojas. The book club read a book approximately every 6 weeks, with online discussion occurring on the Life's Library Discord. Green and Rojas alternated choosing books, with guest curators occasionally making selections. Life's Library was free to participate in, with paid options available to receive digital or physical subscriptions, containing additional materials such as a discussion podcast, or a version of the book itself. All profits from Life's Library were donated to Partners In Health Sierra Leone. The Life's Library project ended in March 2022.

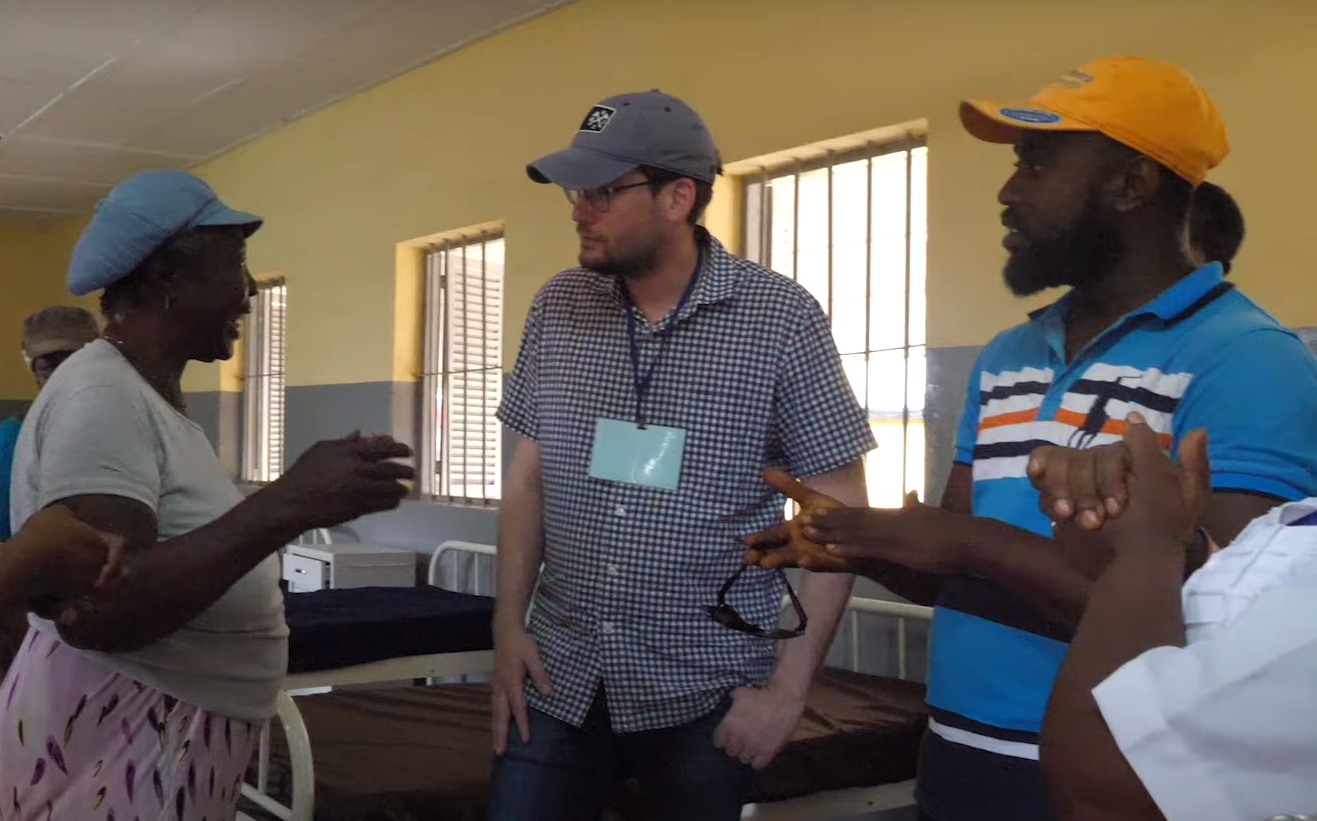
John Green in the Kissy Psychiatric Hospital (now known as Sierra Leone Psychiatric Hospital) in Freetown, Sierra Leone, in April 2019

John and Sarah Urist Green visited Sierra Leone in April 2019 after John was inspired by a December 2017 profile in The New Yorker on PIH co-founder Ophelia Dahl. In October 2019, Green announced that he, Hank, and their families would be donating $6.5 million to Sierra Leone's branch of Partners In Health, as part of an initiative to raise $25 million over the following five years. The goal of the initiative is to help fight maternal mortality, specifically in the country's Kono District, where the money will be used to staff and support the Maternal Center of Excellence, among other primary care centers and health workers. The Paul E. Farmer Maternal Center of Excellence, named for the late PIH co-founder, broke ground in April 2021 and opened to patients in February 2026. John and Hank Green, their families, and the Nerdfighteria community raised approximately $50 million for the hospital's construction, supplies, and training of staff.

In August 2019, John and Hank performed live versions of their own podcasts on stage, with John presenting a new episode of The Anthropocene Reviewed, as well as a live episode of their shared podcast Dear Hank & John, with all profits going to Partners In Health. The live performances returned in March 2020 with a planned three-city tour including stops in Columbus, Ohio, and Carmel, Indiana, with a third performance set for Ann Arbor, Michigan. However, the third performance was cancelled due to the onset of the COVID-19 pandemic in the United States. In September 2021, Green continued his advocacy for refugees, writing an op-ed in The Independent on the need for education for refugee children.

After receiving $429,000 from the Project for Awesome in 2021 and over $100,000 from that year's Pizzamas, Partners in Health received over $1 million during the 2022 Project for Awesome. The week prior to the 2022 Project for Awesome, Partners In Health co-founder Paul Farmer unexpectedly died at the age of 62. Green wrote a tribute to Farmer for The Washington Post.

==== Subscription services and Good Store ====
In November 2020, John and Hank started the "Awesome Socks Club", a monthly subscription service where members receive a pair of socks designed by independent artists. All post-tax profits are donated to the charity, in a business model similar to Newman's Own products. As of October 2022, the Awesome Socks Club had over 40,000 members. In March 2022, the brothers started the "Awesome Coffee Club", with an identical business model and goal to the Awesome Socks Club. The coffee is ethically sourced from Colombia via the brothers' sourcing partner Sucafina. In August 2022, Hank Green reported that the Awesome Socks Club had over 40,000 subscribers and the Awesome Coffee Club had over 10,000 subscribers. A third subscription, called "Sun Basin Soap", was announced in April 2023. These products were brought under the common branding and website of "Good.Store" in August 2023.

As of August 2025, Good Store had donated over $10 million in operating profits. This included $75,000 donated to the Coral Reef Alliance.

==== Appearances and other projects ====
On January 1, 2017, Green began a YouTube series titled "100 Days" in collaboration with his friend Chris Waters. The pair endeavored to get fit and establish healthy habits, while avoiding emphasis on weight loss. Near the end of the effort, Green fundraised for a 10K charity run for Exodus Refugee Immigration, an Indianapolis-based refugee resettlement organization.

At the end of 2018, John Green chose to leave social media for a year, including Twitter, where he had more than 5 million followers. In January 2019, Green wrote an op-ed for The Washington Post on his decision, saying, "I had noticed over the past couple of years that my attention had become more fractured. I found it harder to lose myself in a book, for instance, without feeling the urge to check my phone or open my laptop." Green created a TikTok account in 2020, which has over 2 million followers and 48 million views as of October 2022. In December 2022, Green left Twitter in response to the policy changes made after Elon Musk's acquisition of Twitter.

Green is a frequent lecturer and moderated discussion host. In March 2019, Green moderated a discussion with former First Lady Michelle Obama on her memoir Becoming as part of a YouTube-sponsored event titled "BookTube". In April 2019, Green recorded a live version of the podcast Harry Potter and the Sacred Text at the Indianapolis Central Public Library. Green gave a virtual commencement address to all graduates in May 2020 during the beginning months of the COVID-19 pandemic. In October 2022, Green gave the opening lecture at Harvard University's 2022 William Belden Noble Lecture series, titled "How the World Ends".

=== Focus on global health (2022–present) ===
==== Anti-tuberculosis advocacy ====
Green became a member of the board of trustees for Partners in Health in 2022.

In mid-2023, Green was a leading figure in a successful campaign to persuade pharmaceutical company Johnson & Johnson (J&J) to allow generic versions of the tuberculosis drug bedaquiline to be produced, allowing increased global access to the drug. In May, Green published an op-ed in The Washington Post on the subject. A deal with the Stop TB Partnership was formed after J&J's evergreening of the patent received public backlash from an awareness campaign started by Green in June; J&J stated they had decided to allow generics to be produced the month prior. Two months later, Green urged Cepheid, an American molecular diagnostics company owned by Danaher Corporation, to lower the cost of the cartridges used in their GeneXpert machines to $5, hoping to save lives by giving more people access to early detection of tuberculosis. The pressure campaign was again partially successful, with Danaher reducing the price of one of the most critical tests by one-fifth and committing to make no profit on the sale of that test to lower and middle income countries.

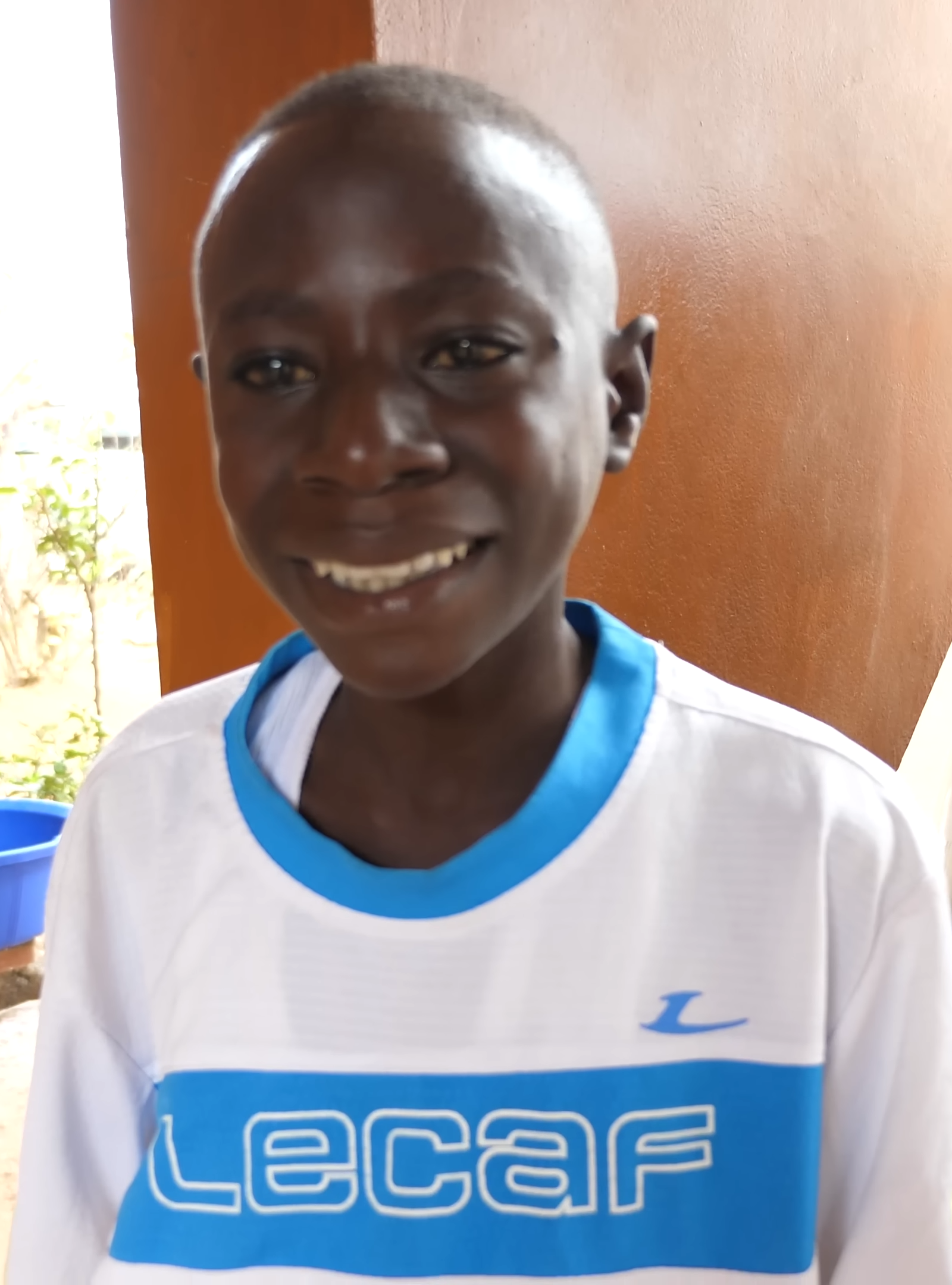
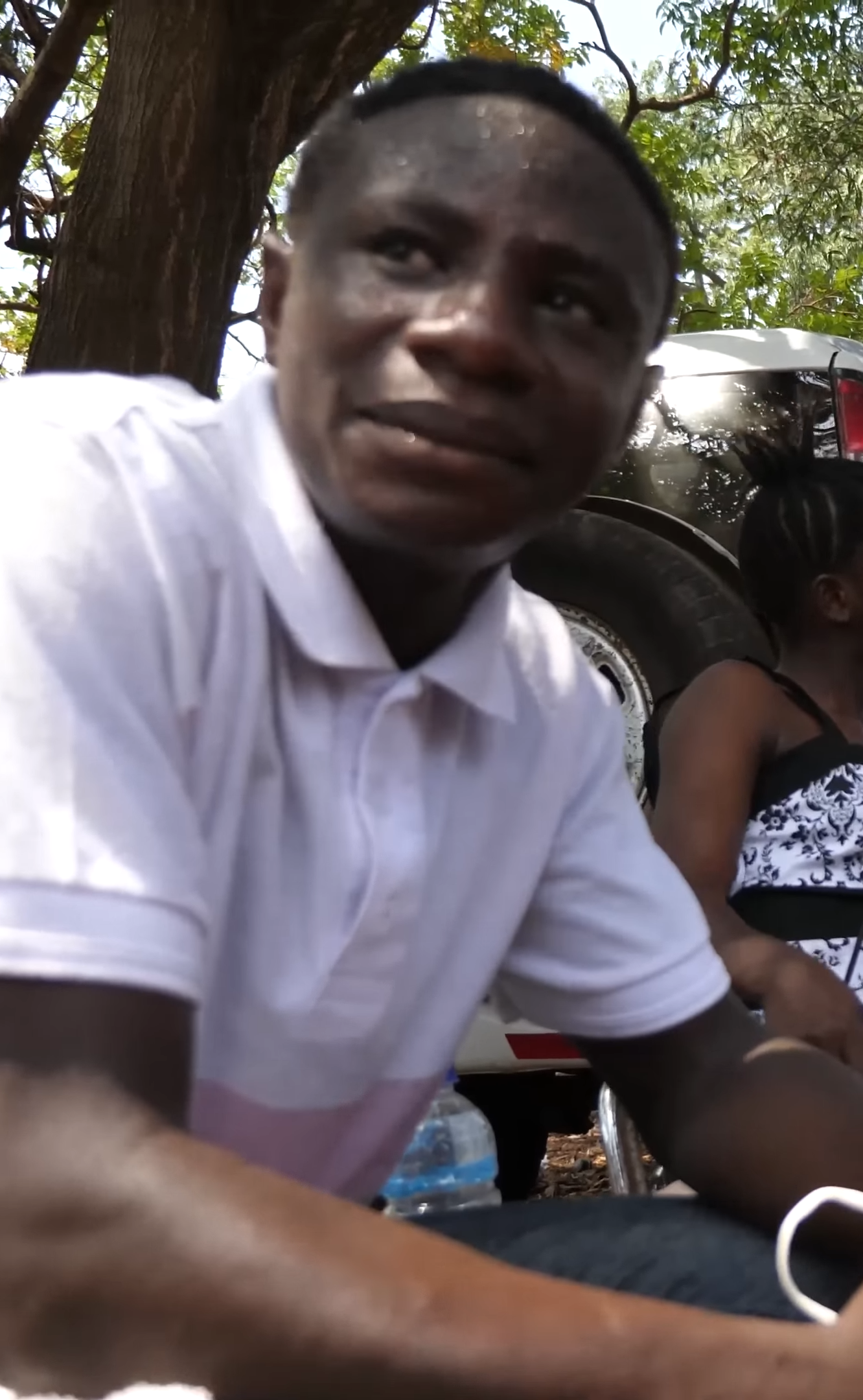
Henry, a young tuberculosis patient profiled by Green in Everything Is Tuberculosis, shown at 16 (left) and four years later (right) after a new treatment regimen

On September 22, 2023, Green attended, and briefly spoke at, a high-level United Nations meeting on tuberculosis. In March 2024, the Green brothers announced that they and their families were pledging $1 million a year through 2027 alongside $10 million provided by USAID and $11 million matched by the Department of Health in the Philippines to address tuberculosis in the Philippines. That same month, the Centers for Disease Control and Prevention (CDC) named John Green a 2024 "TB Elimination Champion" and he published another op-ed in The Washington Post on the need for greater access to tuberculosis diagnostics in poorer countries.

In October 2024, Green announced his second nonfiction book would be titled Everything Is Tuberculosis: The History and Persistence of Our Deadliest Infection. The book was published on March 18, 2025, through Crash Course Books, a new imprint of Penguin Young Readers that is an extension of the Crash Course YouTube channel. In it, Green wrote, "TB has become the organizing principle of my professional life over the last five years." The book tells the history of human responses to tuberculosis intertwined with the story of Henry Reider, a young tuberculosis patient Green met in Sierra Leone in 2019, through which Green asserts that the disease is not primarily caused by the bacteria Mycobacterium tuberculosis anymore but by human choices. The book was a New York Times number-one bestseller in nonfiction for multiple weeks, remaining on the list for 23 weeks.

==== Hollywood, Ending ====
Hollywood, Ending: Chapter 1
Green reading of the first chapter of Hollywood, Ending

In December 2025, Green announced he had been working on a new novel about Hollywood, although he stated he was unsure when or if it would be released. He had earlier told The New York Times that the book he was working on would be "about and for grown-ups". In March 2026, he announced that his next novel, titled Hollywood, Ending would be released in September 2026. The story centers on two young actors and how their lives change through their roles in a biopic about Andy Warhol.

In July 2026, Green announced he would be going on a twenty-city book tour to promote the book from September 20 to October 13. On September 23, 2026, at the tour stop in Brooklyn, New York, Green was recognized as having achieved a Guinness World Record for the most tip-in sheets signed by an author, at 875,557 times.

==== Other efforts ====
In January 2023, John and Hank announced that Crash Course would be offering college courses on YouTube, in continued partnership with Arizona State University and Google, with the project's main goal being to lower the monetary barriers to receive college credit.

In May 2023, Hank announced he had Hodgkin's lymphoma, a type of cancer that affects the lymphatic system. While Hank received chemotherapy and recovered, John took over Hank's role as CEO for their companies DFTBA and Complexly. Laura Joukovski took over the role of CEO at DFTBA in August 2023, and Julie Walsh Smith took over the role of CEO at Complexly in October 2023.

Green had announced in December 2017 that a film adaptation of Turtles All The Way Down was in development by Fox 2000 and Temple Hill Productions. In May 2018, Green confirmed that the film adaptation would be written by Isaac Aptaker and Elizabeth Berger, the screenwriters for Love, Simon. In January 2019, it was announced that Hannah Marks would direct the movie. After Fox 2000 was closed as part of the acquisition of 21st Century Fox by Disney, the film was put on hold. In March 2022, it was announced the film had switched studios to New Line Cinema and would be released on the streaming service HBO Max. The film, starring Isabela Merced, began filming in April 2022. Green and Rosianna Halse Rojas served as executive producers. Turtles All the Way Down was released on Max on May 2, 2024. Green makes a cameo appearance in the film as Mr. Adler, a gym teacher at the protagonists' high school.

In the lead-up to the 2026 World Cup, Green teamed up with novelist, journalist, and old friend from Indian Springs School, Daniel Alarcón, to cohost a podcast about international football called The Away End. The weekly podcast examines international football alongside broader themes of literature, politics, and culture. Green and Alarcón appeared as guests on the KQED public radio program Forum, in a July 13 segment dedicated to analyzing the tournament's final matchups.

== Influence and reception ==
=== Books ===
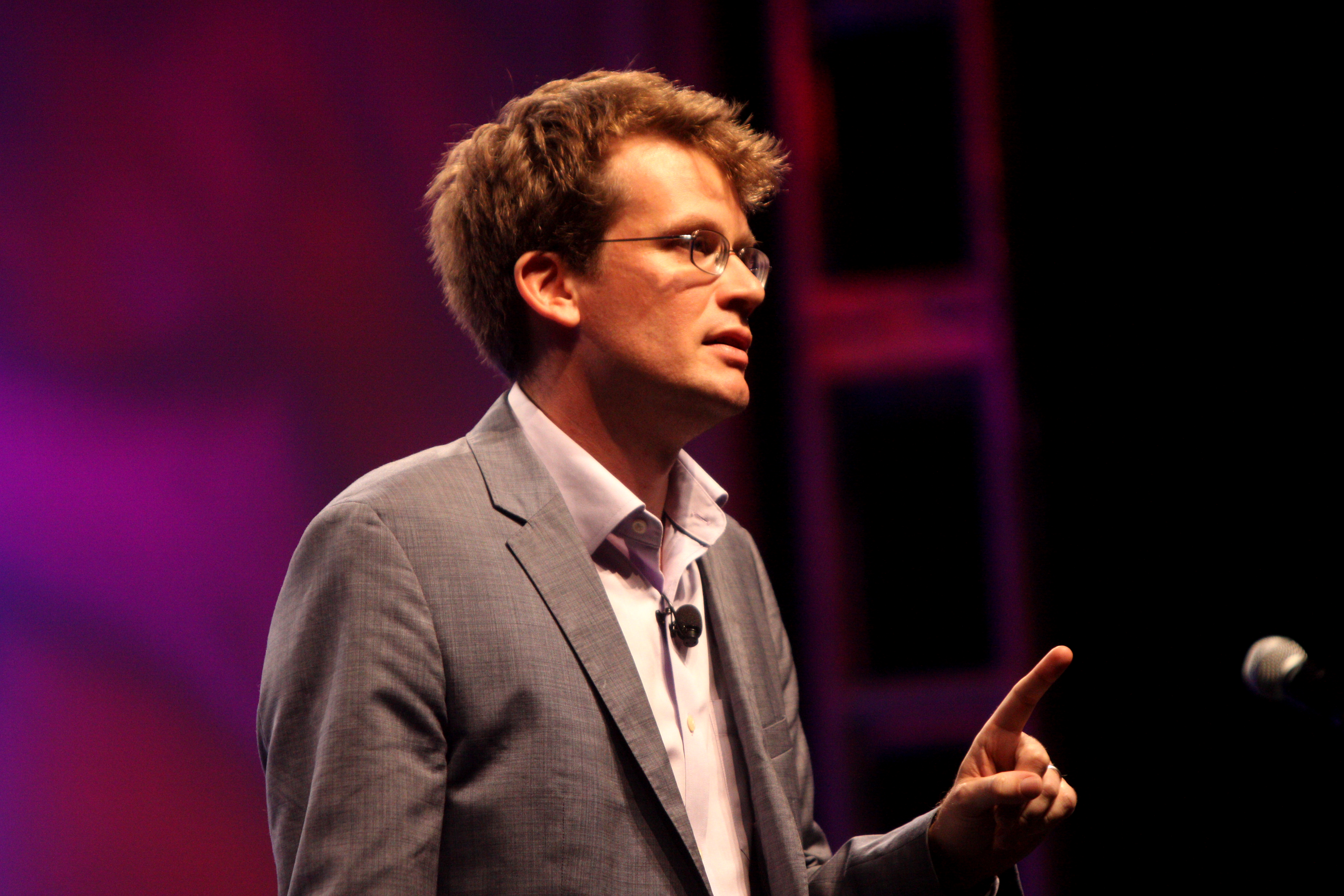
Green at VidCon 2012

All of Green's books have received positive critical reception and appeared on the New York Times Best Seller list. Green's books have been translated into 55 languages with more than 50 million copies in print worldwide, including The Fault in Our Stars, which is one of the best-selling books of all time. Green's idiosyncratic voice and rapid rise to fame in 2014 are credited with creating a major shift in the young adult fiction market. While reviewing the Andrew Smith young-adult novel, Winger, A. J. Jacobs of The New York Times used the term "GreenLit" to describe young adult books that contain "sharp dialogue, defective authority figures, occasional boozing, unrequited crushes, and one or more heartbreaking twists". According to The Wall Street Journal, "[s]ome credit him with ushering in a new golden era for contemporary, realistic, literary teen fiction, following more than a decade of dominance by books about young wizards, sparkly vampires, and dystopia. A blurb or Twitter endorsement from Mr. Green can ricochet around the Internet and boost sales, an effect book bloggers call 'the John Green effect'." Zareen Jaffery, executive editor of Simon & Schuster Books for Young Readers said: "What I really like about what people are calling 'the John Green effect' is that there's more of an interest in authentic, genuine, relatable characters." Some readers and authors have been critical of the terms. Green himself voiced his disagreement with the idea that he is single-handedly responsible for launching or promoting any one individual's career.

Critics have also noted Green's evolution as an author. With the release of the Turtles All the Way Down in 2017, several reviewers referenced a dismissive perception of Green's now very popular œuvre as "sad teen books", which had emerged since the success of The Fault in Our Stars. Despite this, they praised Turtles All the Way Down as truthful and authentic enough to transcend these imagined drawbacks. Matt Haig of The Guardian wrote, "Turtles All the Way Down often dwells in cliché, but only as pop songs and epic poems do, mining the universal to create something that speaks to the familiar rhythms of the heart. It might just be a new modern classic." Likewise, with the release of The Anthropocene Reviewed book in 2021, Scott Neumyer of Shondaland wrote that, "Green may have made his name by writing fiction (and for good reason), but this first foray into nonfiction is his most mature, compelling, and beautifully written book yet."

Green has received criticism for his perceived writing of "Manic Pixie Dream Girls", a term coined by Nathan Rabin to describe a female character that, "exists solely in the fevered imaginations of sensitive writer-directors to teach broodingly soulful young men to embrace life and its infinite mysteries and adventures". Paper Towns and the character of Margo Roth Spiegelman have often been cited as a deconstruction of the "Manic Pixie Dream Girl" trope, and Green has stated he specifically wrote her as such. In October 2022, Green tweeted, "I think basically all criticisms of my work are correct and justifiable other than the most popular one, 'he writes manic pixie dream girls,' which is just so stupid. [...] THE WHOLE POINT OF THE NOVELS is the danger of such misimagining, hence the eventual revelation: 'Margo was not a miracle. She was not an adventure. She was not a fine and precious thing. She was a girl.' It's not like I made it subtle." Despite this, some critics have questioned whether the story adequately deconstructed the trope, or merely perpetuated it. Green has readily discussed what he believes to be flaws in his novels when he looked at them in retrospect. Additionally, in response to a fan's tweet, Green apologized for using the word retarded in Paper Towns, stating, "Yeah, I regret it. At the time, I thought an author's responsibility was to reflect language as I found it. Still, now... eight years later, I don't feel like a book about humanizing the other benefited from dehumanizing language."

==== Book bannings ====
Several of Green's books have been the subject of book banning attempts. Looking for Alaska was named the most challenged book of 2015 by the American Library Association, with some people complaining about the book's "offensive language" and "sexually explicit descriptions". In September 2022, a group of parents attempted to ban the novel from all school libraries in Orange County, Florida, a district Green had attended as a child.

In August 2023, The Fault in Our Stars was removed from the young adult section at a library in the Indianapolis suburb of Fishers, Indiana, and moved to the general collection after a policy decision was made by the library's board that targeted "language about sexuality and reproduction, profanity and criminal acts". Green responded with a letter to the board, stating the library should "walk this awful policy back and allow the real experts to decide where to shelve my books and those of my colleagues". A Twitter post he made stating, "You Won't Catch Me Alive or Dead in Fishers, Indiana" was turned into a t-shirt by a local clothing company, with proceeds being donated to the Kurt Vonnegut Museum and Library. After the move received significant attention, the board decided to move the novel back to the Young Adult section, later suspending the policy responsible altogether. In October, Green discussed book banning at an event hosted by Indiana State Senator Andrea Hunley at the Indianapolis Central Library.

In November 2023, Green joined a lawsuit by Penguin Random House, the Iowa State Education Association, and fellow authors Laurie Halse Anderson, Malinda Lo, and Jodi Picoult, against the state of Iowa over a new law that banned books that depict sex acts from schools. In August 2024, he joined another lawsuit by Hachette Book Group, HarperCollins Publishers, Macmillan Publishers, Simon & Schuster, and Sourcebooks as well as fellow authors Julia Alvarez, Laurie Halse Anderson, Jodi Picoult, and Angie Thomas against the state of Florida over the state's book-banning law.

=== Online ventures ===
As John and Hank Green began uploading YouTube videos regularly in 2007, they became part of the early culture of YouTube as the modern content creator industry was born from the YouTube Partner Program. The New York Times noted John as having "[an] uncanny knack for channeling the voice of marginalized but smart, self-identifying nerds, a gift he has turned into a YouTube empire". Many others have come to regard the brothers and their YouTube empire as pioneering in the online video space. In 2011, The Daily Dot named the Green brothers as the most important people on YouTube.

The Vlogbrothers' content has received positive reception from commentators and fans, especially for the shared values expounded by their videos. Amelia Thomson-Deveaux writing for The American Prospect commented that, "what makes Nerdfighteria so potent does seem to be the moral imperative that the Brothers Green throw at their bajillion viewers' feet: to take their weirdness and anxiety and turn it into empathy. It's become kind of a culture." The Crash Course project has also been successful in its reach, with the John Green-hosted "World History" series alone having attracted millions of viewers.

== Personal life and interests ==
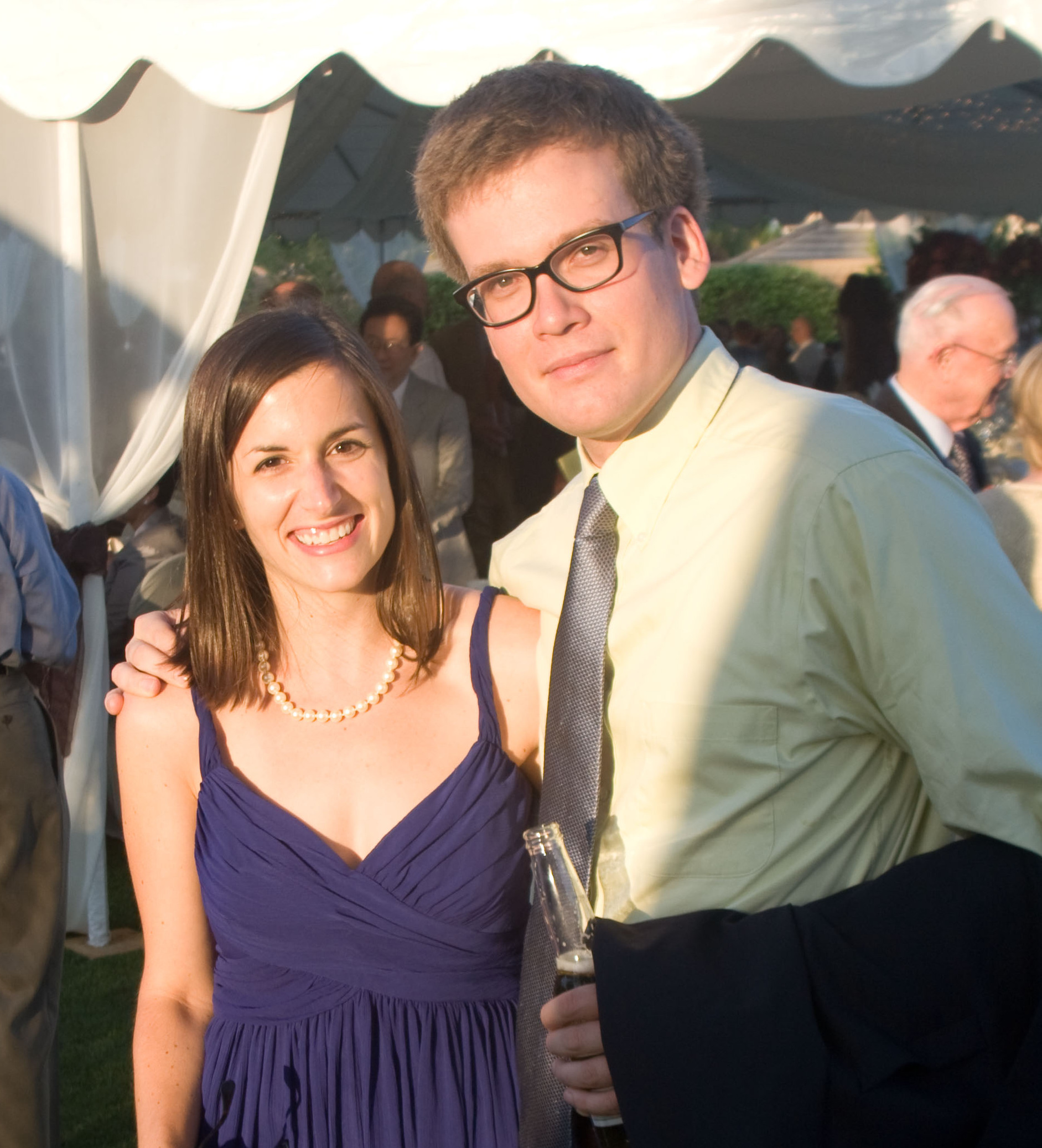
John Green with his wife Sarah Urist Green in 2008

Green is an Episcopalian, and was married in a Catholic church. He is married to Sarah Urist Green, with whom he has two children. John and Sarah met when they both attended the same preparatory school in Indian Springs, Alabama. They became reacquainted eight years later in Chicago, when Green began dating Sarah's boxing partner; after they broke up, John became friends with Sarah. The two became engaged in April 2005 and married in May 2006. In early videos on the VlogBrothers channel, Sarah is referred to as "the Yeti" due to her not appearing visibly on camera, though she is no longer referred to as such.

Green was born in Indianapolis, Indiana, and has lived there since 2007. The city has served as the setting for several of his novels, and he wrote a review of it in his podcast and book of essays The Anthropocene Reviewed. Green often speaks of his love for the city. On July 14, 2015, Greg Ballard, the mayor of Indianapolis, proclaimed that that day would be "John Green Day" in his city. That month, Teresa Jacobs, the mayor of Orange County, Florida, declared that July 24 would also be John Green Day.

Green is an avid sports fan. He drove the pace car at the 2016 Grand Prix of Indianapolis, and was honorary co-chairman of the 500 Festival Host Committee that year. He is also a supporter of the English football club Liverpool F.C. of the Premier League and an official sponsor of the English League One club AFC Wimbledon, whose kit have featured a Nerdfighters emblem on the back of their shorts since 2014. Starting in 2011, Green had a gaming series on YouTube where he played FIFA, first as the "Swoodilypoopers", a fictionalized version of Swindon Town F.C., and then, starting in 2013, as the "Wimbly Womblys", a fictionalized version of AFC Wimbledon. Advertising revenue from the series was donated to the team. In January 2025, Green facilitated the transfer of Marcus Browne to Wimbledon, partially from earnings from his livestreaming.

Green has stated he has aphantasia.

== Works ==
=== Books ===
==== Fiction ====
- Looking for Alaska (2005)
- An Abundance of Katherines (2006)
- Let It Snow: Three Holiday Romances (2008) – with Maureen Johnson and Lauren Myracle
- Paper Towns (2008)
- Will Grayson, Will Grayson (2010) – with David Levithan
- The Fault in Our Stars (2012)
- Turtles All the Way Down (2017)
- Hollywood, Ending (2026)

==== Non-fiction ====
- The Anthropocene Reviewed: Essays on a Human-Centered Planet (2021)
- Everything Is Tuberculosis: The History and Persistence of Our Deadliest Infection (2025)

=== Short stories ===
- "The Approximate Cost of Loving Caroline", Twice Told: Original Stories Inspired by Original Artwork (2006), illustrated by Scott Hunt
- "The Great American Morp", 21 Proms (2007), edited by David Levithan and Daniel Ehrenhaft
- "Freak the Geek", Geektastic: Stories from the Nerd Herd (2009), edited by Holly Black
- "Reasons", What You Wish For: A Book for Darfur (2011)

=== Other ===
- Cocktail Party Cheat Sheets (2006), Mental Floss gift book for which Green served as an editor and contributor
- Scatterbrained (2006), Mental Floss gift book for which Green served as an editor and contributor
- What's the Difference? (2006), Mental Floss gift book for which Green served as an editor and contributor
- Thisisnottom (2009), an interactive novel hidden behind riddles.
- Zombicorns (2010), an online Creative Commons licensed zombie novella.
- The War for Banks Island (2012), a sequel to Zombicorns, released as a Project for Awesome donation perk.
- The Sequel (2012), an unfinished novel, much of which was reworked into The Fault in Our Stars. The first 6,000 words were released as a Project for Awesome donation perk.
- Space and The Cat and the Mouse (2013), stories released as Project for Awesome donation perks
- An Imperial Affliction (2014), extracts used as a prop in the film adaptation of The Fault in Our Stars and later released as a Project for Awesome donation perk.
- This Star Won't Go Out: The Life and Words of Esther Grace Earl (2014), by Esther Earl, Wayne Earl, and Lori Earl, introduction by John Green
- My Drunk Kitchen (2014), by Hannah Hart, foreword by John Green
- The Golden Rule: Deluxe Edition (2019), by Ilene Cooper, foreword by John Green
- The Shortest History of Our Universe: The Unlikely Journey from the Big Bang to Us (2022), by David Baker, foreword by John Green

=== Filmography ===
Year	Title	Format	Role	Notes	Ref(s).
2007–present	Vlogbrothers	YouTube series	Himself	—N/a	
2012–present	Crash Course	YouTube series	Host	Also writer and producer	
2013–2019	Mental Floss	YouTube series	Host	Also producer	
2014	The Fault in Our Stars	Film	Little Girl's Father	Uncredited, extended-cut only	
2014–2020	The Art Assignment	YouTube series	Executive producer	—N/a	
2015	Paper Towns	Film	Becca's father (Voice)	Uncredited, also executive producer	
2015	Malhação	TV show	John Green	Season 22, Episode 251	
2017	My Brother, My Brother and Me	TV show	Himself	Episode 4: "Teens & Your Least Favorite Soda"	
2019	Looking for Alaska	TV show	Executive producer	—N/a	
2019	Let It Snow	Film	Co-author of original book	—N/a	
2019–2022	Ours Poetica	YouTube series	Executive producer	—N/a	
2020	Dil Bechara	Film	Author of original book	—N/a	
2022	Welcome to Wrexham	TV show	Himself	Episode 7: "Wide World of Wales"	
2022	Jet Lag: The Game	YouTube series	Himself (cameo)	Season 3, Episode 3	
2024	Turtles All the Way Down	Film	Mr. Adler	Also executive producer	

== Awards ==
Year	Award	Category	Work	Result	Ref(s).
2006	Michael L. Printz Award	—N/a	Looking for Alaska	Won	
2006	Los Angeles Times Book Prize	Young Adult Novel	Looking for Alaska	Finalist	
2007	Michael L. Printz Award	—N/a	An Abundance of Katherines	Runner-up	
2007	Los Angeles Times Book Prize	Young Adult Novel	An Abundance of Katherines	Finalist	
2007	Audie Award	Young Adult Title	Looking for Alaska	Finalist	
2009	American Library Association Award	Best Books for Young Adults	Paper Towns	Selected	
2009	Edgar Allan Poe Award	Best Young Adult Novel	Paper Towns	Won	
2009	Audie Award	Young Adult Title	Paper Towns	Finalist	
2010	Corine Literature Prize	Young Adult Novel	Paper Towns	Won	
2011	Odyssey Award for Excellence in Audiobook Production	—N/a	Will Grayson, Will Grayson	Runner-up	
2011	Stonewall Book Award	Children's & Young Adult	Will Grayson, Will Grayson	Finalist	
2011	Indie Lit Award	GLBTQ	Will Grayson, Will Grayson	Runner-up	
2011	Shorty Award	Best Author	Will Grayson, Will Grayson	Won	
2011	Audie Award	Young Adult Title	Will Grayson, Will Grayson	Finalist	
2012	Chicago Tribune's Young Adult Literary Prize	—N/a	—N/a	Won	
2012	Indiana Authors Award	National Author Award	—N/a	Won	
2013	Odyssey Award for Excellence in Audiobook Production	—N/a	The Fault in Our Stars	Won	
2013	Hörbuchbestenliste	Audiobooks for Children and Youth	The Fault in Our Stars	Won	
2013	Indies Choice Book Awards	Indie Champion Award	The Fault in Our Stars	Won	
2013	Indies Choice Book Awards	Young Adult	The Fault in Our Stars	Won	
2013	Children's Choice Book Awards	Teen Book of the Year	The Fault in Our Stars	Won	
2013	Audie Award	Young Adult Title	The Fault in Our Stars	Won	
2013	Amelia Elizabeth Walden Award	—N/a	The Fault in Our Stars	Won	
2013	Guardian Children's Fiction Prize	—N/a	The Fault in Our Stars	Shortlisted	
2013	Shorty Award	Best Author	—N/a	Won	
2013	Honorary Doctorate of Letters from Butler University	—N/a	—N/a	Granted	
2014	Los Angeles Times Book Prize	Innovator's Award	—N/a	Won	
2014	MTV Fandom Awards	Visionary Award	—N/a	Won	
2014	Queen of Teen Award	—N/a	—N/a	Nominated	
2014	Premio Bartolomé Hidalgo	Infantil Juvenil de Autor Extranjero (Children's Youth by a Foreign Author)	The Fault in Our Stars	Won	
2015	Kids Choice Awards	Favorite Book	The Fault in Our Stars	Nominated	
2015	Young Reader's Choice Award	Senior	The Fault in Our Stars	Won	
2015	Shorty Award	Distinguished Achievement in Internet Culture	—N/a	Won	
2015	Webby Award	First Person Video	Mental Floss on YouTube	Won	
2015	Webby Award (as executive producer)	Video Channels & Series, Science & Education	Crash Course	Honoree	
2016	Honorary Doctorate of Letters from Kenyon College	—N/a	—N/a	Granted	
2016	International OCD Foundation Illumination Award	—N/a	—N/a	Won	
2018	American Library Association Award	Amazing Audiobooks for Young Adults	Turtles All the Way Down	Won	
2018	Webby Award (as executive producer)	Video Channels & Series, Science & Education	Crash Course	Honoree	
2020	Indiana Arts Commission Governor's Arts Award	—N/a	—N/a	Won	
2021	Andrew Carnegie Medals for Excellence in Fiction and Nonfiction	—N/a	The Anthropocene Reviewed	Longlisted	
2021	Goodreads Choice Award	Best Nonfiction	The Anthropocene Reviewed	Won	
2024	CDC U.S. TB Elimination Champion	—N/a	—N/a	Honoree	
2025	Cameron Boyce Pioneering Spirit Award (with Hank Green)	—N/a	—N/a	Honoree	
2025	Eleanor Roosevelt Banned Book Award	—N/a	Looking for Alaska	Honoree	
2025	Books Are My Bag Readers' Awards	Non-fiction	Everything is Tuberculosis	Shortlisted	
2025	Goodreads Choice Award	Best Nonfiction	Everything is Tuberculosis	Won	
2026	Audie Award	Narration by the Author	Everything is Tuberculosis	Won	
2026	Guinness World Records	Most tip-in sheets signed by an author	—N/a	Won	

== See also ==
- List of young adult fiction writers
- List of YouTubers
