= Ilene Cooper =

American author and reviewer (born 1948)

Ilene Cooper (born March 10, 1948) is an American author and reviewer of children's books.

== Early life and education ==
Cooper was born in Chicago, where she graduated from Sullivan High School. She later attended the Missouri School of Journalism, where she majored in radio and television. After working at WGN-TV for several years, she enrolled in Rosary College, where she received her Master of Science in Library Science.

== Career ==
Cooper began her career as a children's librarian at the Winnetka Public Library. She is the children's books editor at the book review magazine Booklist. She has also written numerous children's books about feminism and politics.

In the mid-2000s, John Green was working at Booklist, where he was mentored by Cooper, when his book Looking for Alaska won the Michael L. Printz Award. During this time, Green gave a draft copy of Looking for Alaska to Cooper, before the book was published; Cooper later recalled that after reading this draft, she thought that "He had a voice you could tell was quite original," and decided she would work with him. She has also described herself as Green's "fairy godmother".

In 2002–2003, Cooper won a National Jewish Book Award in the Children Literature category for Jewish Holidays All Year Round. In 2007, she won the Illinois Reading Council Prairie State Award for Excellence in Writing for Children.
