= An Abundance of Katherines =

2006 young adult novel by John Green

- Author: John Green
- Language: English
- Genre: Young adult novel
- Publisher: Dutton and Speak
- Publication date: 21 September 2006
- Publication place: United States
- Media type: Print (Paperback)
- Pages: 256 pp
- ISBN: 0-525-47688-1
- OCLC: 65201178
- LC Class: PZ7.G8233 Abu 2006

An Abundance of Katherines is a young adult novel by John Green. Released in 2006, it was a finalist for the Michael L. Printz Award.

The novel includes an appendix by Daniel Biss, a close friend of Green, that explains some of the more complex equations used by the main character, Colin Singleton.

== Plot summary ==
Colin Singleton, a child prodigy living in Chicago, fears he will not maintain his genius as an adult. Over the span of his life, Colin has dated nineteen girls named 'Katherine'. After being dumped by his girlfriend, Katherine XIX, Colin is longing to feel whole, and longing to matter. He hopes to become a genius by having a "eureka" moment.

After graduating from high school, and before college, Colin's best and only friend, Hassan Harbish, convinces him to go on a road trip to take his mind off the breakup. Colin goes, hoping to find his "eureka" moment. After reaching a rural Tennessee town called Gutshot, they visit the supposed resting place of Archduke Franz Ferdinand. There, they meet Lindsey Lee Wells and her mother Hollis, whose family runs a local textile mill. Hollis allows Colin and Hassan to stay with her family and offers them a summer job interviewing the town's residents and assembling an oral history of Gutshot.

Colin begins to like Lindsey, though he is foiled by her boyfriend, Colin Lyford (he and Hassan call him TOC, "the other Colin"), whose father is employed by Lindsey's mother. Colin is still chasing his eureka moment, finally finding it in the theorem he created called the "Theorem of Underlying Katherine Predictability". It determines the curve of any relationship based on several factors of the personalities of the two people in a relationship. His theorem eventually works for all but one of his past relationships with a Katherine—which the novel explores.

While the back stories of Colin's life play out, Hassan finds a girlfriend, Katrina, a friend of Lindsey's. Their relationship is cut short when Colin and Hassan catch Katrina having sex with Lyford while on a feral-hog hunt with Lindsey, her friends and Lyford's father. A fight between Lyford and all the surrounding acquaintances begins when Lindsey finds out that he has been cheating on her. Injured in the fight, Colin anagrams the Archduke's name while in the graveyard to dull the pain, and realizes that it is actually Lindsey's great-grandfather, named Fred N. Dinzanfar, who is buried in the tomb.

Colin finds Lindsey at her secret hideout in a cave, where he tells her the story of every Katherine he has ever loved. Lindsey tells him how she does not feel sad but instead slightly relieved by Lyford's affair. They discuss what it means to them to "matter" and eventually confess their love for each other. As their relationship continues, Colin decides to use his theorem to determine whether he and Lindsey will last. The graph reveals that they will only last for four more days. Four days later he receives a note from Lindsey, saying that she cannot be his girlfriend because she is in love with Hassan; however, a P.S. at the bottom makes it clear that she is only joking. Colin realizes that his theorem cannot predict the future of a relationship; it can only shed light on why a relationship failed. Despite this, Colin is content with not "mattering". Hassan says that he is applying for two college classes, which Colin has been trying to convince him to do throughout the book. The story ends with the trio driving past the restaurant they were originally planning to go to, because Colin, Lindsey, and Hassan realize that they can just keep driving; there is nothing stopping them from continuing on.

== Main characters ==
Colin Singleton
Colin Singleton is an anagram-loving seventeen-year-old boy who is depressed. Though he was a child-prodigy with an IQ of over 200, he has not yet become a "genius". Colin finds everything interesting, especially things that other people seem not to care much about. Because of this, it is difficult for people to relate to him. After only dating Katherines, Colin breaks the streak by dating Lindsey Lee Wells, whom he met on his road trip with Hassan. Throughout the novel Colin feels as though there is a hole in his stomach, and he is looking to fill it. Colin spends his time striving to be unique, but with Lindsey's help, ends up coming to the realization that he is "not-unique in the very best way possible."
Hassan Harbish
Hassan Harbish is Colin Singleton's lazy, funny, and slightly overweight best (and only) friend. Though he is smart and has been accepted to college, Hassan takes a year off. At first he does not seem to plan on furthering his education. He convinces Colin to go on a road trip to break out of his depression. Hassan is Muslim and prays regularly, acting with strict religiosity, until he dates Katrina. Hassan is an integral part of Colin's journey to find his true identity.
Lindsey Lee Wells
Lindsey Lee Wells meets Colin Singleton and Hassan Harbish on their road trip in Gutshot, Tennessee. She is a paramedic-in-training who also gives tours of Gutshot. When Lindsey first appears in the novel, she is dating Lyford. However, she does not feel that she is truly herself until she starts hanging around Colin. Like him, Lindsey seems to be struggling with her identity. Inspired by Colin's ability to always be himself, Lindsey finally becomes herself. She also becomes Colin's girlfriend after her break-up with Lyford.
Hollis Wells
She is Lindsey's mother and an extreme workaholic who is very kind to the people who work at her factory.

== Style and format ==
The novel is written in a third-person narrative. Green used third person to create empathy for Colin. In a blog post, Green wrote that the novel "needed to be written in third person, because it's about a guy whose brain does not lend itself to narratives, and who struggles to tell stories in ways other people find interesting."

The story includes many footnotes that become an essential part to understanding Colin's brain and how it works. Green says that the footnotes "function as a kind of competing narrative that comments upon and—for lack of a better word—problematizes the central narrative." An Abundance of Katherines is a work of fiction that includes many mathematical terms and academic language. With the footnotes and the appendix that is at the end of the novel, Green gives his readers "a way of attempting to achieve precision and clarity" of the story in general, but more specifically, Colin's mind.

The book consists of 19 chapters to highlight the number 19. These chapters include Colin's flashbacks, which are "meant to reflect the relationship we have between chronological narrative and emotional narrative." This format is also known as a non-linear narrative.

== Symbols ==
Archduke Franz Ferdinand
Franz Ferdinand is an anagram of Lindsey's great-grandpa's name, Fred N. Dinzanfar. Ferdinand becomes a symbol of what is most important to Colin: mattering. Though Ferdinand is famous, he did not really do much; he is famous for being shot. "While some people are remembered, others are forgotten, and a lot of times it doesn't matter whether we try to do something noteworthy or not. History gets to decide, ultimately, whether we're remembered."
Lindsey's Cave
Lindsey's cave is her "super, incredibly top secret location that no one on Earth knows about." Colin is the only person she shows the cave to. This symbolizes the comfort and trust in their relationship. It also stands for Lindsey's privacy. Green has acknowledged that the cave can also be seen as a representation for Lindsey's vagina. He says that Colin's romantic journey with Lindsey "is a journey away from the (phallic) obelisk and toward the (sapphic) cave, and in the end only in the place associated with femininity is Colin able to become authentically himself with someone else."

== Awards ==
An Abundance of Katherines was a 2007 Michael L. Printz Award Honor Book and received recognition as one of American Library Association's Best Books for Young Adults.

== Film adaptation ==
John Green mentioned in Brotherhood 2.0, a video blog he created with his brother, on 10 December 2007, that rights had been bought to make his book into a movie. Green was asked to write the screenplay. On his website, it states that the project was abandoned, though a different production company currently has the rights with hope for the future. In an interview with Josh Horowitz in 2014, Green stated that with the exception of Looking for Alaska (Paramount had the film rights to it), all of his books were in his control in regard to their film adaptation.
