= Turtles All the Way Down (novel) =

2017 young adult drama novel by John Green

- First edition cover
- Author: John Green
- Cover artist: Rodrigo Corral
- Language: English
- Genre: Young adult novel; Realistic fiction
- Published: October 10, 2017
- Publisher: Dutton Books
- Publication place: United States
- Media type: Print (hardcover)
- Pages: 286
- ISBN: 978-0-525-55536-0 (unsigned edition); 978-0-525-55538-4 (signed edition)

Turtles All the Way Down is a young adult drama novel written by American author John Green published on October 10, 2017, by Dutton Books. It is Green's fifth solo novel and his seventh overall. The novel debuted at number 1 on The New York Times Best Seller list in the category of "Young Adult Hardcover Books" and stayed at the top for 15 weeks and remained on the list for 62 weeks.

== Background ==
The story centers on 16-year-old Aza Holmes, an American high school student with OCD and anxiety, and her search for a fugitive billionaire who happens to be a neighbor's father. She is grieving the loss of her own father while a budding relationship grows between her and the billionaire's son. Additionally, the novel explores Aza's relationship with her best friend, Daisy. The only other details of the plot revealed to the public before release were that it was to contain, either literally or figuratively, a tuatara, Star Wars fan fiction, an unexpected reunion, friendship, and values of life.

Speaking about the novel, Green stated: "This is my first attempt to write directly about the kind of mental illness that has affected my life since childhood, so while the story is fictional, it is also quite personal."

The title alludes to the concept of infinite regress.

== Plot summary ==
Aza Holmes is a 16-year-old high school student living in Indianapolis who struggles with OCD, which often manifests as a fear of the human microbiome. Constantly worried about infection, particularly by C. diff, she repeatedly opens a never-fully-healed callus on her finger in an effort to drain out what she believes are pathogens. Throughout the book, Aza is accompanied by two close friends: Mychal Turner, an aspiring artist, and her best friend Daisy Ramirez, who writes Star Wars fan fiction.

One day at school, Daisy discovers that Russell Pickett, a billionaire construction magnate and the father of one of Aza's old friends, Davis Pickett, has gone missing in the wake of corporate crime investigations on September 9. Russell's wife had died years prior, so Russell's disappearance leaves Davis and his younger brother Noah with no formal guardian. Tempted by the reward of $100,000 for information leading to Pickett's arrest, Daisy takes Aza on a search for the missing billionaire. After canoeing down the White River and sneaking onto the Pickett property, they copy a picture of Pickett that was taken shortly after the night he disappeared from Davis's night-vision camera, and are caught by a security guard who brings them to meet Davis.

To persuade the two girls to not turning in the picture to the authorities, Davis gives Aza $100,000 taken from his father's various stashes around the guest house, which she splits with Daisy. After the meeting, Davis and Aza begin dating and, at the same time, Daisy becomes romantically involved with Mychal. As time passes, Aza comes to believe that she cannot overcome her anxiety, preventing her from ever having a normal relationship with Davis. She finds numerous blog posts written by him about his feelings on both his father's disappearance and his relationship with her.

Aza reads Daisy's fan fiction for the first time and discovers that Daisy has been using it as a vent for her frustrations with Aza. She continues to spiral into a panic attack which results in her drinking hand sanitizer and passing out. Their friendship deteriorates, culminating in a heated argument while Aza is driving on the highway that results in a car accident. Aza spends eight days in the hospital, during which she again has a panic attack, due to her fears of C. diff, and drinks sanitizer again, this time being caught by her mother. She recovers and goes on to rekindle her friendship with Daisy. Aza also begins to improve her abilities to manage her compulsions by focusing on routine (include fulfilling her promise to Noah of help finding his father), practicing exposure and response prevention (ERP), and taking new prescriptions.

Later, at an underground art exhibition inside an unfinished drainage tunnel system off of Pogue's Run that Russell Pickett's company was responsible for, Aza and Daisy go exploring on their own. After noticing the stench of putrefaction emanating from the area they realize that this was where Russell Pickett had run off to, and they suspect that the billionaire has already died. Aza tells Davis of their discovery, and he makes an anonymous tip to the police. The authorities locate the body, which is later reported to be that of Russell Pickett.

Given the loss of their parents and home, added to the fact that their father had left his entire fortune to his pet tuatara, Davis and Noah decide to relocate to Colorado, where they have rented a house and will be attending school. As Davis and Aza say their goodbyes, Aza reflects on the open possibilities of her future.

== Publication history ==
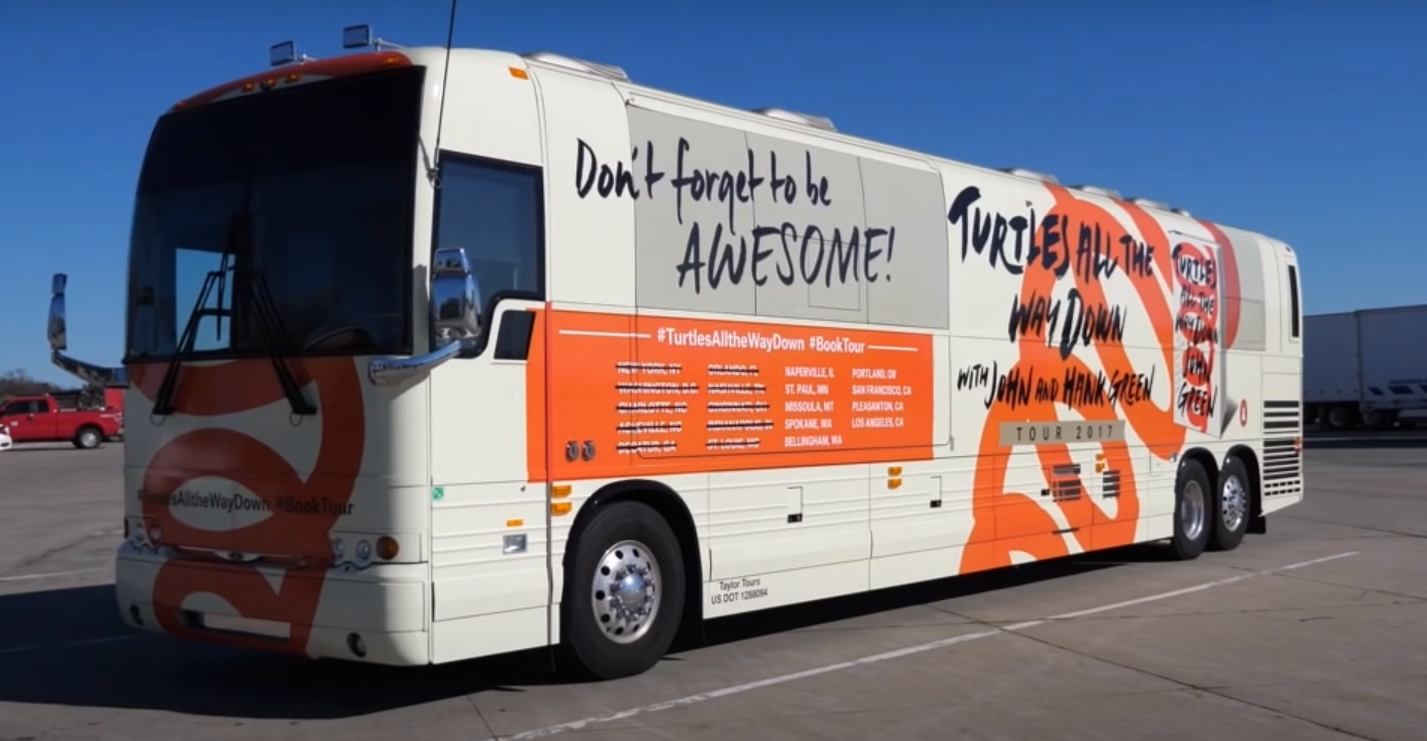
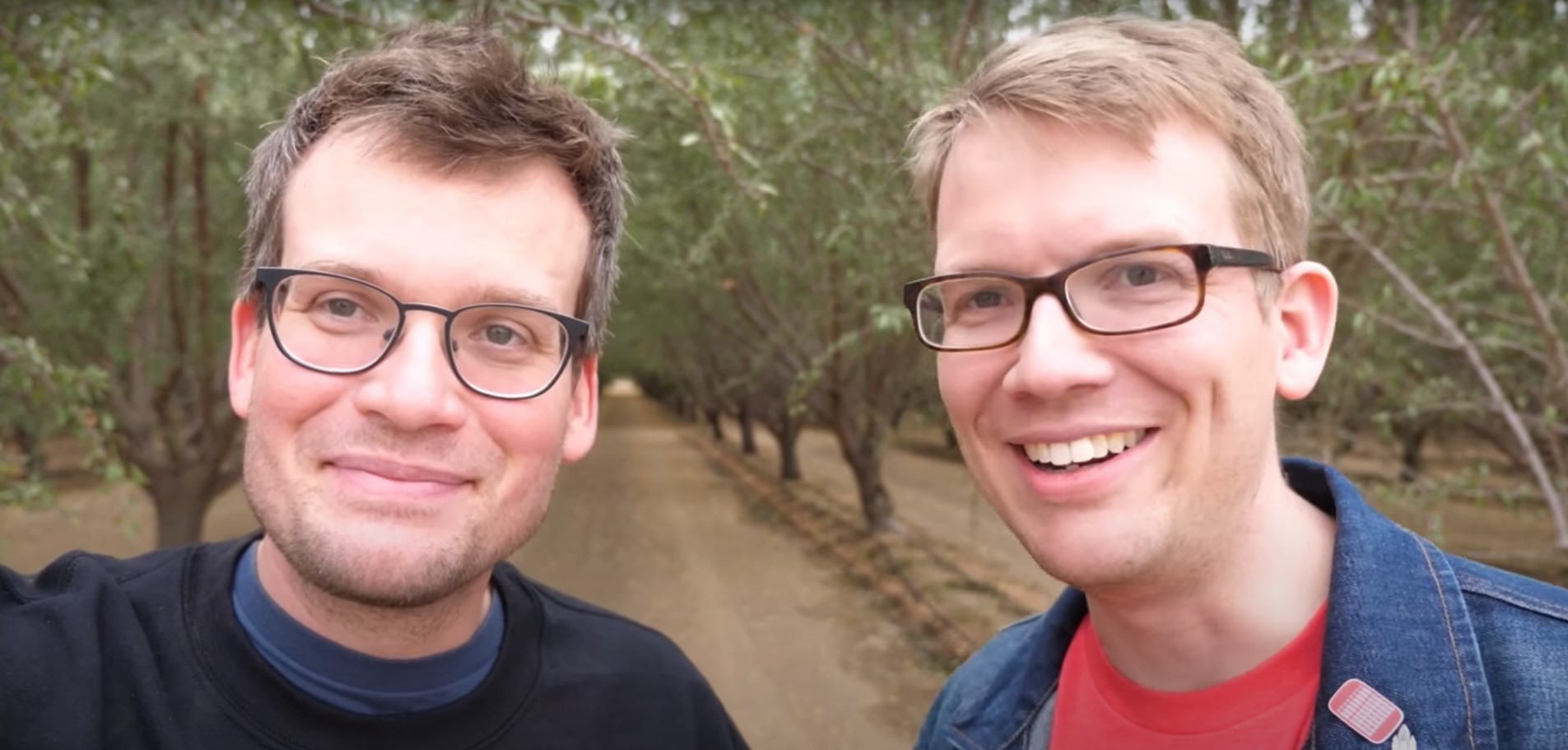
John and Hank Green (in an almond orchard) and their tour bus during the 2017 book tour for Turtles All The Way Down

A section of the novel was read aloud by Green during the Project for Awesome live stream in December 2016. In order to protect the book's copyright, this section of the live stream was not archived and is no longer available online. In the months leading up to the novel's announcement, Green left various clues in his weekly Vlogbrothers videos, whereupon some members of Nerdfighteria worked together to solve these hints and reveal more information about the book. In September, Green posted a video of himself narrating the first chapter of the novel on the Vlogbrothers channel. Upon the release of his book, he and his brother Hank Green went on a book tour.

== Critical reception ==
The book debuted to positive reviews. The New York Times praised it as "surprising and moving" and wrote that "one needn't be suffering like Aza to identify with it. One need only be human" and described it and its focus on anxiety as Green's most personal book yet. Many reviewers noted Green's talent for keen observation, sharpened more in this case by Green's own struggles with OCD, the mental illness depicted in the novel. Several reviewers referenced a dismissive perception of Green's now very popular oeuvre as "sad teen books", which emerged since the popularity of The Fault in Our Stars, but praised Turtles All the Way Down as truthful and authentic enough to transcend these imagined drawbacks. "It often dwells in cliché, but only as pop songs and epic poems do, mining the universal to create something that speaks to the familiar rhythms of the heart," wrote Matt Haig of The Guardian. "It might just be a new modern classic."

== Film adaptation ==
In December 2017, Green announced that a film adaptation of his latest novel was in development. It was directed by Hannah Marks and stars Isabela Merced as Aza and Cree Cicchino as Daisy. It was released by New Line Cinema on the streaming service Max on May 2, 2024.
