= Internet Girls =

Young adult novel series by Lauren Myracle

- Author: Lauren Myracle
- Genre: Young adult fiction
- Publisher: Harry N. Abrams
- Publication date: April 1, 2005

Internet Girls is a young adult novel series by American author Lauren Myracle published between 2005 and 2014. The series includes four books (ttyl; ttfn; l8r, g8r; and yolo), as well as a book companion (bff: a girlfriend book you write together). The series follows best friends Maddie (madmaddie), Angela (SnowAngel), and Zoe (zoegirl) through high school. In 2004, the first book of the series, ttyl, gained attention for being the first book written entirely in the style of an instant messaging conversation.

Despite the books' positive reception, the series became the ninth-most banned book between 2000 and 2019.

== Books ==
- ttyl, published April 1, 2004
- ttfn, published March 1st 2006
- l8r, g8r, published March 1st 2007
- yolo, published August 26th 2014

== Reception ==
The Internet Girls series has often landed on the American Library Association's list of banned and challenged books. The books received the number seven spot in 2007, the number three spot in 2008, the number one spot in 2009 and 2011. Challengers content the book due to offensive language and sexually explicit content, as well as being unsuited for the age group and going against a religious viewpoint. Ultimately, the Internet Girls series became the ninth-most banned book between 2000 and 2019.
