= Upside-Down Magic =

US children's fantasy book series and its franchise

- Created by: Sarah Mlynowski, Lauren Myracle, and Emily Jenkins
- Original work: Upside-Down Magic

Print publications
- Novels: Upside-Down Magic; Sticks & Stones; Showing Off; Dragon Overnight; Weather or Not; The Big Shrink; Hide and Seek; Night Owl
- Graphic novel: no

Films and television
- Television film: Upside-Down Magic

Upside-Down Magic is a Scholastic book series by Sarah Mlynowski, Lauren Myracle, and Emily Jenkins. The series follows eight kids in a world with magical abilities: Elinor "Nory" Boxwood Horace, Elliott Cohen, Bax Kapoor, Andres Padillo, Pepper Phan, Marigold Ramos, Willa Ingeborg, and Sebastian Boondoggle.

It was adapted into a 2020 television film for Disney Channel.

== Novels ==
1. Upside-Down Magic (2015)
2. Sticks & Stones
3. Showing Off
4. Dragon Overnight
5. Weather or Not
6. The Big Shrink
7. Hide and Seek
8. Night Owl

== Magic Types (in the book series) ==
=== Flyers ===
Flyers have the power of levitation, starting out by staying a few feet above the floor. Advanced Flyers are able to transport others, or have telekinesis.

=== Fuzzies ===
Fuzzies can communicate with animals and start out feeding animals and later connect with them. Certain Fuzzies can understand animal language.

=== Fluxers ===
Fluxers can turn into animals. They mostly start out fluxing into kittens, then move on to more difficult animals. The protagonist Nory, is an upside-down fluxer, that can add certain aspects of multiple different animals at once, like the squid-puppy.

=== Flares ===
See Pyrokinesis for the psychic power similar to the Flare power

Flares can set things on fire, heat things up, and create flames. The fire typically appears from their hands, but some can produce it from their mouth.

=== Flickers ===
Flickers can make other things invisible or make themselves invisible. Powerful Flickers are able to select parts of an object to turn invisible. In the film, due to budget constraints, Flickers have telekinesis.

=== Upside Down Magic (UDM) ===
UDM is an unconventional power, usually a variant or opposite of the above five. For example, Bax Kapoor is a Fluxer who turns into rocks and other inanimate objects. Also, Elliot Cohen can produce ice and fire as a Flare. Sometimes it's just random, and not related to one of the five, like Marigold Ramos who has the ability to shrink objects.

=== Double-Talents ===
Double talents are rare and possess two types of magic. For example, Mitali is a Flare-Fluxer who turns into animals who are able to perform flare magic.

== Film adaptation ==
Disney Channel optioned the book series in 2015. Production on a Disney Channel Original Movie starring Izabela Rose, Siena Agudong, Vicki Lewis, Kyle Howard, Elie Samouhi, Alison Fernandez, and Max Torina began in August 2019. The television film also features Cynthia Kaye McWilliams, Elaine Kao, Yasmeen Fletcher, Amitai Marmorstein, and Callum Seagram Airlie, and premiered on Disney Channel on July 31, 2020. In the film the only UDM students are Pepper Paloma (Alison Fernandez), Nory Horace (Izabela Rose), Elliot Cohen (Elie Samouhi), and Andres Padillo (Max Torina). A typical Flare named Reina Carvajal (Siena Agudong) is also introduced in the film.
