= UDM =

UDM may stand for:

- Udmurt language (ISO 639 language code), a Uralic language
- Union of Democratic Mineworkers, a trade union in Nottinghamshire, England
- United Democratic Movement, a South African political party
- United Democratic Movement (Kenya), a Kenyan political party
- Universal Docking Module, a once-proposed portion of the International Space Station
- Universidad de Manila, a university in Manila, Philippines
- University of Detroit Mercy, a private Roman Catholic university in Detroit, Michigan
- Upside-Down Magic, a fantasy book series by Sarah Mlynowski, Lauren Myracle, and Emily Jenkins
  - Upside-Down Magic (film), a Disney Channel film loosely based on the books

== See also ==
- UdeM (disambiguation)
- DM (disambiguation) for micro-DM (μDM / uDM)
