= Pripstein's Camp Mishmar =

Pripstein's Camp Mishmar מחנה משמר
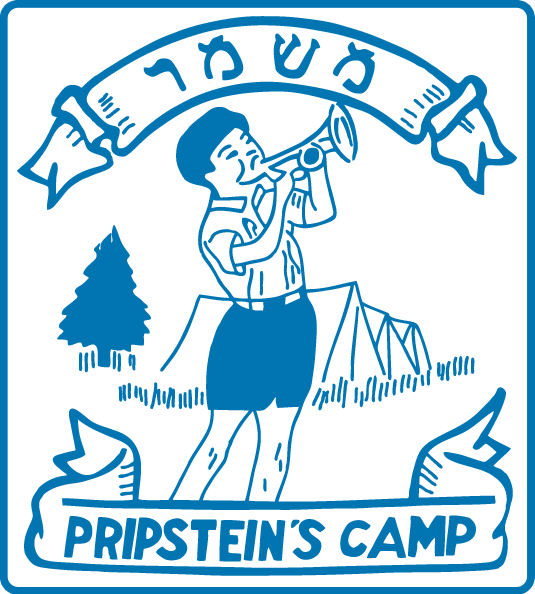

Location
- 1580 Chemin du Lac-des-Trois-Frères; St. Adolphe d'Howard, Quebec, J0T 2B0
- Coordinates: 45.98310°N 74.35732°W

Information
- Type: Private summer camp
- Established: 1941
- Closed: 2014; 11 years ago
- Age range: 7–16
- Language: English
- Tuition: $1000–$2000/wk
- Communities served: Jewish and anglophone communities
- Affiliation: Ontario Camping Association
- Website: mishmar.com

Pripstein's Camp Mishmar (Hebrew: מַחֲנֶה מִשְׁמָר) was a private co-educational summer camp in St. Adolphe d'Howard, Quebec, which operated from 1941 to 2014. Though not strictly a Jewish summer camp, Mishmar predominantly catered to a middle- and upper-class Jewish clientele. In its seventy year history, the camp hosted a number of prominent future writers, businesspeople, and politicians.

== History ==
Camp Mishmar was founded by Chaim Pripstein, a Hebrew teacher at United Talmud Torahs who had fled Poland to Canada before World War II. A Hebrew teacher at United Talmud Torahs, Pripstein became a peddler in the Laurentians to supplement his income, acquiring land from a local farmer near St. Jerome in 1941. Pripstein decided to rent it out to local Jewish families during the summer, and soon left his job as a school teacher to run a modest Jewish country hotel on the land with his wife Pearl. The hotel became known for its literary gatherings, hosting such writers as Isaac Bashevis Singer.

As their business grew, the Pripsteins set up a residential camp for about ten children, which quickly grew into a proper summer camp complete with a playing field and tennis court. The camp emphasized Jewish culture and physical fitness. The camp relocated to the shore of Lac des Trois Frères in St. Adolphe d'Howard in 1954, after local authorities deemed the river running through the original site polluted.

At its peak in the 1960s, the camp had an average of 240 campers each summer. The camp was closed in 2014 because of declining enrolment and financial difficulties.

== Facilities ==
Camp Mishmar boasted top-quality sports facilities, including a covered pool, a covered basketball court, a 1,765-square-metre (19,000 sq ft) sports complex with an indoor roller rink, skate park and rock climbing centre, and an indoor ice rink. Food at Camp Mishmar was 'kosher style', though the camp only served kosher meat in its early years. Jewish rituals such as lighting Shabbat candles were nonetheless maintained.

== Literary references ==
Leonard Cohen fictionalized Pripstein's Camp Mishmar in The Favourite Game (1963), which was based upon a journal he kept while working at the camp as a counsellor. Sarah Mlynowski used her ten years at Pripstein's as inspiration for her novel Spells and Sleeping Bags (2007).

== Notable alumni ==
- Dov Charney, founder of American Apparel
- Leonard Cohen, poet and singer-songwriter
- Sarah Mlynowski, writer
- Cory Pecker, professional ice hockey player
- Heather Reisman, founder of Indigo Books and Music
- Hugh Segal, former senator
- Robert Silverman, actor
- Lionel Tiger, anthropologist
- Ruth Wisse, scholar of Yiddish literature
