= Izabela Rose =

American actress & actress

- Born: December 17, 2006 (age 19); Flowery Branch, Georgia
- Occupation: Actress, singer
- Years active: 2017–present

Izabela Rose is an American actress and singer. She is best known for playing Young Jess in the time-travel mystery thriller drama series Secrets of Sulphur Springs and the lead role of Nory in the fantasy film Upside-Down Magic.

== Early life ==
Rose was born in Flowery Branch, Georgia to parents of African-American, Salvadoran and Italian descent. She began modeling and competing in pageants all over the Southeast at an early age. In 2016 she booked her first commercial for Freeform then known as ABC Family. Soon after, she relocated to Los Angeles to pursue her passions of acting and singing. It took three years before she landed her first contract with Disney Channel.

== Career ==
Her breakthrough came when she was cast by Steven Spielberg in the American anthology series Amazon Stories. She got the role after the writer came up to her while she was auditioning in Atlanta and told her she was doing a great job. Her first big role came playing the younger version of Jess portrayed by Diandra Lyle in the time-travel mystery thriller drama series Secrets of Sulphur Springs. She starred alongside Siena Agudong, portraying Nory in the Disney film Upside-Down Magic based on the book series of the same name. She played the lead role of Quinn in the mystery adventure film The Curious Case of Dolphin Bay.

== Personal life ==
Outside of acting she likes to play video games, guitar, and learning to speak Spanish, the language of her father and grandmother. She also spends her time volunteering with the Atlanta Mission and other charities dedicated to helping the homeless, a cause she is very passionate about.

== Filmography ==
=== Film ===
Year	Title	Role	Notes
2017	His Story	Young girl in class	Short
2017	Young Adult	Extra	Short
2020	Siena Agudong, Izabela Rose: A Place for Us	Singer	Short
2020	Upside-Down Magic	Nory	
2022	The Curious Case of Dolphin Bay	Quinn	

=== Television ===
Year	Title	Role	Notes
2021	Secrets of Sulphur Springs	Young Jess	9 episodes

== Discography ==
=== Singles ===
- A Place for Us (2020) with Siena Agudong
- Almost There (2021) with Dara Reneé and Ruth Righi
- Sunkissed (2024)
- Be Careful, Love (2025)
- Honey Honey Baby (2025)
- Tipsy Truth (2025)
- It Is What It Is (2026)
- Pieces of Me (2026)
