= U of M =

U of M is an abbreviation that can refer to any of several universities:

== In the United States ==
- University of Maine
- University of Maryland
- University of Massachusetts
- University of Memphis
- University of Miami
- University of Michigan
- University of Minnesota
- University of Mississippi
- University of Missouri, officially uses the acronym MU
- University of Montana

== In other countries ==
- University of Melbourne, Australia
- Universidad de Mendoza, Argentina
- University of Manitoba, Canada
- University of Montreal, Canada
- University of Munich, Germany, officially uses the acronym LMU Munich
- State University of Malang, Indonesia
- University of Mashhad, Iran
- University of Macau, Macau
- University of Malaya, Malaysia
- University of Malta, Malta
- University of Mauritius, Mauritius
- Maputo University, Mozambique
- Maastricht University, Netherlands
- University of Manila, Philippines
- University of Mindanao, Philippines
- Universidade do Minho, Portugal
- University of Murcia, Spain
- University of Manchester, UK

== See also ==
- UdeM (disambiguation)
- UM (disambiguation)
- MU (disambiguation)
