= Upside-Down Magic (film) =

American fantasy television film

- Promotional poster
- Genre: Fantasy
- Based on: Upside-Down Magic by: Sarah Mlynowski; Lauren Myracle; Emily Jenkins
- Written by: Nick Pustay; Josh Cagan
- Directed by: Joe Nussbaum
- Starring: Izabela Rose; Siena Agudong
- Music by: Tom Howe
- Countries of origin: United States; United Kingdom; Spain
- Original language: English

Production
- Executive producers: Suzanne Farwell; Susan Cartsonis; Joe Nussbaum
- Producer: Drew Locke
- Cinematography: Adam Santelli
- Editor: Gordon Rempel
- Running time: 96 minutes
- Production companies: Resonate Entertainment; Bad Angels Productions

Original release
- Network: Disney Channel
- Release: July 31, 2020

Upside-Down Magic is a 2020 American fantasy film released as a Disney Channel Original Movie. It is an adaptation of the eponymous fantasy book series by Sarah Mlynowski, Lauren Myracle, and Emily Jenkins. The film stars Izabela Rose and Siena Agudong and co-starring Vicki Lewis. It premiered on Disney Channel on July 31, 2020.

== Plot ==
Best friends Elinor "Nory" Boxwood-Horace and Reina Carvajal discover they have magical powers: Nory can transform into animals and Reina can control fire. They enroll at Sage Academy, a prestigious magic school.

At Sage Academy, there are different classes for each student: the Flare class for students who can create fire with their hands, the Fluxer class for those who can turn into animals, the Flyer class is for those who can fly a few feet from the ground, the Fuzzy class for those who can talk to animals, and the Flicker class for those who can levitate things to them with the flick of a finger. The duo must test their magical powers to see if they are fit to be in the honors-level classes for their magic category, while following the school's rules known as "the Sage way".

During the test, Reina shows off her flare skills while Nory unintentionally transforms into a cat/dragon hybrid while trying to turn into a cat. Reina is placed in the Honors Flare class, but Nory is placed in the Upside-Down Magic program, a program for problem students who have imperfect abilities as Headmistress Knightslinger considers them to be easy targets for the Shadow Magic, an evil force that uses a person's magic against everyone else through possession. There are three other students who also bombed their tests. Elliot, an upside-down Flare, Pepper, an upside-down Flicker, and Andres, an upside-down Flyer. As Nory and her fellow students secretly plan to perfect their abilities while assisting Budd in his grounds keeping, Headmistress Knightslinger is unaware that the Shadow Magic has ways of targeting the most unlikely students.

Reina discovers a book about Shadow Magic and, unaware of the Shadow Magic legend that Nory and the other UDMs were taught, takes the book to the dorm and finds a page about strengthening magical abilities. Reina reads the page because she was being belittled by a fellow Flare student named Phillip who has more Flare experience than her, and even her strange new friend Chandra is unable to fully help her.

Budd finds that his students are working to perfect their abilities in secret and agrees to help them while keeping Headmistress Knightslinger from finding out.

The next day, Reina prepares for Founders’ Day, where Reina competes against Phillip. Reina's powers are unusually strong and she gets to represent the Flares. Nory attempts to crash the competition by turning into a kitten to prove that UDMs can be just like normal students, but instead becomes an elephant/cat/dragon hybrid. Reina uses Nory's favorite Flare move to snap Nory out of it, but it almost burns Nory because Reina's powers have been so unusually strengthened.

The Shadow Magic book starts appearing after where Reina goes when she tries to get rid of it, and Chandra acts increasingly strange and has knowledge of the book. Reina tells Chandra to take the book with her. Chandra takes it, but it just reappears in Reina's room. Chandra is revealed to be an embodiment of Shadow Magic in human form the next day when the other Flares cannot see who Reina is talking to. Chandra manipulates Reina and possesses her.

Meanwhile, Budd reveals to the UDMs that he's an upside-down Fuzzy (he can sing to animals but not talk to them) and decides rather than perfect their powers like everyone else, help them improve their powers so they have better control over them.

At Founders' Day, Reina goes up to represent the Flares and uses a complicated Flare trick and becomes a shadow-like being who threatens to destroy the entire school. Eventually, it is the UDMs who are able to rescue Reina and return her to normal enough for her to defeat the Shadow Magic. After the incident, Nory and the UDMs are moved into their respective magic classes and Budd is now an official Fuzzy teacher; the Sage way is also abolished and the students are now free to do their own things.

In a pre-credit scene, the Shadow Magic book falls off the shelf as it opens on a specific page that shows the magic logo with one symbol that has been removed in the normal magic logo, hinting that Shadow Magic is not fully defeated and it seems to have its own lost category of magic that it wants to show the world at any destructive cost.

== Cast ==
- Izabela Rose as Elinor "Nory" Boxwood-Horace, a 13-year old abnormal Fluxer who can transform into unusual hybrid animals like a Dritten (a cat/dragon hybrid).
  - Melody Nosipho Niemann as Young Nory
- Siena Agudong as Reina Carvajal, Nory's best friend and Flare student who can manipulate fire.
- Kyle Howard as Budd Skriff, the teacher of the Upside Down Magic school and groundskeeper who is later revealed to be an abnormal Fuzzy that can only communicate to animals by singing.
- Elie Samouhi as Elliot Cohen, an abnormal Flare who can make smoke instead of fire.
- Alison Fernandez as Pepper Paloma, an abnormal Flicker who can push things away from her.
- Max Torina as Andres Padillo, an abnormal Flyer who can fly to increasingly high heights and has trouble coming back down causing him to use a rope or weight to keep him on the ground.
- Vicki Lewis as Linda Knightslinger, the headmistress of Sage Academy.
- Yasmeen Fletcher as Chandra, a manifestation of Shadow Magic who can only be seen by Reina.
- Callum Seagram Airlie as Phillip, a student in the Flare class who belittles and competes with Reina.
- Cynthia Kaye McWilliams as Professor Argon, the teacher of the Flare class.
- Elaine Kao as Professor Han, the teacher of the Fluxer class.
- Amitai Marmorstein as Professor Lewis, the teacher of the Flicker class.

== Production ==
=== Development and casting ===
Disney Channel optioned the book series in 2015. Production began in August 2019 with the cast announcement. Joe Nussbaum directed and executive produced the film, with Suzanne Farwell and Susan Cartsonis also executive producing; Nick Pustay and Josh Cagan worked on the teleplay.

=== Filming ===
Principal photography took place on Vancouver Island. Shawnigan Lake School was used as the setting for Sage Academy, with students used as extras.

== Release ==
Upside-Down Magic premiered on Disney Channel on July 31, 2020. The film was released on DVD on November 10, 2020. It was later made available to stream on Disney+.

== Reception ==
=== Critical response ===
Alex Reif of LaughingPlace.com gave Upside-Down Magic a grade of four out of five and said that while the film is predictable and derivative of stories like The Worst Witch and Harry Potter, it remains enjoyable for a younger audience unfamiliar with those tales. Reif concluded that while parents may find the story reminiscent of similar themes from their own childhoods, the movie's charm and magical story are likely to make it a hit with Disney Channel's target audience. Emily Ashby of Common Sense Media gave the film a score of four out of five stars and noted the depiction of positive messages and role models, citing teamwork and friendship in the story. Ashby noted that Nory's positive attitude towards her differences makes her a strong role model for kids, saying that while the character challenges authority to make her point, the ends are justified. Ashby concluded that the movie might also inspire kids to read the books.

== Accolades ==
Year	Award	Category	Nominee(s)	Result	Ref.
2021	Canadian Cinema Editors Awards	Best Editing in Family, Television Movie or Series	Gordon Rempel	Nominated	
2021	Leo Awards	Best Picture Editing Youth or Children's Program or Series	Gordon Rempel	Won	
