= UdeM (disambiguation) =

The acronym UDEM, UdeM or U de M may refer to the following universities:

== Asia ==
- Universidad de Manila, Manila, Philippines

== North America ==
- Université de Moncton, New Brunswick, Canada
- Université de Montréal, Quebec, Canada
- University of Monterrey, Monterrey, Nuevo León, Mexico

== South America ==
- Universidad de Medellín, Medellín, Colombia
- Universidad de Mendoza, Mendoza, Argentina

== See also ==
- U of M (disambiguation)
- UDM (disambiguation)
- UM (disambiguation)
