= Kelly Frye =

American actress

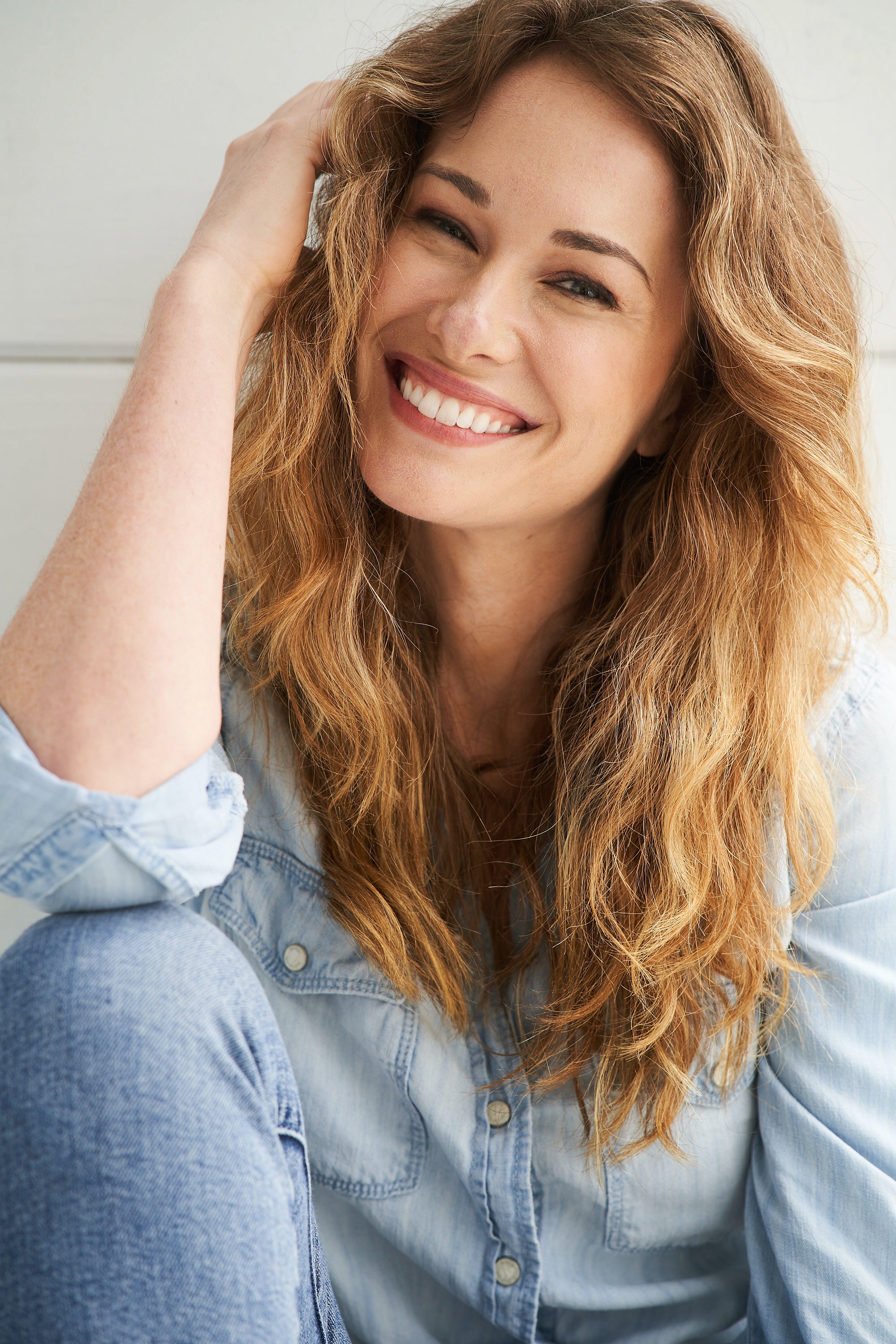
- Kelly Frye in 2022
- Born: December 6, 1984 (age 41); Houston, Texas, U.S.
- Education: Loyola Marymount University (BBA)
- Occupation: Actress
- Years active: 2006–present

Kelly Frye (born December 6, 1984) is an American actress. She is known for her roles in Criminal Minds: Beyond Borders, Criminal Minds, Rake, and The Flash.

== Early life ==
Frye was born in Houston, Texas, and attended Clear Lake High School. Frye is one of five children. She has Irish and Australian roots. She graduated from Loyola Marymount University in three years with a BBA in international business and business law and a minor in Asian-Pacific studies.

== Career ==
Frye's first acting role was a small part in the short film Twilight's Grace. After a few appearances in television and television films, she later received guest appearances in popular American series, including Life, House, The Mentalist, Body of Proof, NCIS: Los Angeles, Anger Management and The Flash.

In 2014, Frye started to receive more recurring roles. Her first recurring role was as Cindy Beck in Rake. This was followed by appearances in the soap operas General Hospital and The Young and the Restless. In 2016, Frye secured the role of Kristy Simmons, the wife of Agent Matt Simmons (Daniel Henney) on Criminal Minds: Beyond Borders. In 2017, after the end of Criminal Minds: Beyond Borders, her role was of Kristy Simmons was added to the original series, Criminal Minds, after Henney was added to the main cast. She then was cast on the Disney Channel series Secrets of Sulphur Springs.

== Filmography ==
=== Film ===
Year	Title	Role	Notes
2008	Legacy	Alison	
2009	Celebrities Anonymous	Sam	
2009	Chloe and Keith's Wedding	Bartender	
2010	Exquisite Corpse	Justine	
2018	Danger One	Valerie	
2021	12 Mighty Orphans	Mary Jane	
2023	Hypnotic	Viv	

=== Television ===
Year	Title	Role	Notes
2007–2008	Roommates	Heather	Web series; main role
2007	Burn	Laurie Carter	TV movie
2009	Life	Air Hostess	Episode: "Shelf Life"
2009	Celebrities Anonymous	Sam	Web series
2011	House	Salesgirl	Episode: "Family Practice"
2012	The Mentalist	Kati Bauer	Episode: "Cheap Burgundy"
2013	Body of Proof	Julie	Episode: "Disappearing Act"
2013	NCIS: Los Angeles	Robin Henson	Episode: "Unwritten Rule"
2014	Rake	Cindy Beck	Recurring role; 3 episodes
2014	Anger Management	Kayla	Episode: "Charlie and the Lap Dance of Doom"
2014	The Flash	Bette Sans Souci / Plastique	Episode: "Plastique"
2014–2015	General Hospital	Ivy	Recurring role; 5 episodes
2015	NCIS	Lieutenant Kara Gifford	Episode: "Viral"
2016	The Young and the Restless	Michelle Hazelton	Recurring role; 7 episodes
2016–2017	Criminal Minds: Beyond Borders	Kristy Simmons	Recurring role; 5 episodes
2017–2020	Criminal Minds	Kristy Simmons	Recurring role; 8 episodes
2018	Lonely and Horny	Drea	Episode: "The Groomsman"
2018	The Family Business	Lois	3 episodes
2018	Teachers	Gina Meyers	3 episodes
2019	Sydney to the Max	Maggie	Episode: "Can't Hardly Date"
2019	L.A.'s Finest	Shauna	Episode: "Book of Secrets"
2019	All Rise	D.D.A. Katie Malick	Recurring Role; 2 episodes
2019	Best Friend Type	Kayla	Episode: Pilot
2020	All the Way to the Top	Josie Jones	Recurring Role; 3 episodes
2021–2023	Secrets of Sulphur Springs	Sarah Campbell	Main role
2023	Magnum P.I.	Margot Atkins	Episode:"Consciousness of Guilt"
2024	9-1-1: Lone Star	Trina Mathis	Recurring Role; 3 episodes
2025	Law & Order: Special Victims Unit	Sharon Hayward	Episode:"Calculated"
2025	The Rookie	Heidi	Episode:"The Good, the Bad, and the Oscar"
