= Team Kaylie =

2019 live action television series

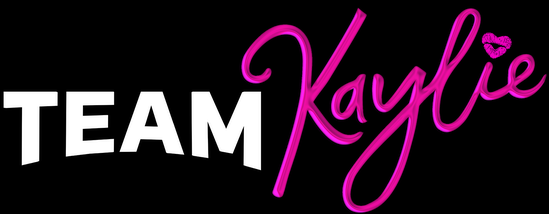
- Genre: Sitcom
- Created by: Tracy Bitterolf
- Developed by: Pamela Eells O'Connell
- Directed by: Bob Koherr
- Starring: Bryana Salaz; Alison Fernandez; Symera Jackson; Elie Samouhi; Kai Calhoun; Eliza Pryor
- Music by: Scott Clausen
- Country of origin: United States
- Original language: English
- No. of seasons: 1 (3 parts)
- No. of episodes: 20

Production
- Executive producer: Pamela Eells O'Connell
- Producer: Shari Tavey
- Cinematography: Jim Roberson
- Editors: Chris Harvey; Kirk Benson; Russell Griffin
- Running time: 27–30 minutes
- Production companies: Bon Mot Productions; Glass Sneaker Productions

Original release
- Network: Netflix
- Release: September 23, 2019 – February 3, 2020

Team Kaylie is an American television sitcom created by Tracy Bitterolf and developed by Pamela Eells O'Connell, directed by Bob Koherr and starring Bryana Salaz and Alison Fernandez.

Netflix ordered 20 episodes of the series. The first five episodes were released on September 23, 2019 on Netflix, with another six released on December 2, 2019, and the final nine were released on February 3, 2020.

== Plot ==
Kaylie Konrad (Bryana Salaz) is a famous 19-year-old billionaire and reality TV show celebrity who gets into a car accident and is sentenced to one-year of community service leading a Wilderness Club at an inner city middle school.

== Cast ==
=== Main ===
- Bryana Salaz as Kaylie Konrad
- Alison Fernandez as Amber
- Symera Jackson as Jackie
- Elie Samouhi as Chewy
- Kai Calhoun as Ray Ray
- Eliza Pryor as Valeria

=== Recurring ===
- Rosa Blasi as Kit Konrad
- David Gridley as Colt Axelrod
- Nicole Sullivan as Principal Dana
- Scarlett Abinante as Kamantha Konrad

== Episodes ==
No. overall	No. in season	Title	Directed by	Written by	Original release date
Part 1
1	1	"Be-wilderness"	Bob Koherr	Tracy Bitterolf and Pamela Eells O'Connell	September 23, 2019
Kaylie Konrad (Bryana Salaz), a 19-year-old reality TV show celebrity, is sent to one year of community service after a car accident. She is sent to guide the wilderness club at Pico Middle School which consists of Amber (Alison Fernandez), Jackie (Symera Jackson), Ray Ray (Kai Calhoun), Chewy (Elie Samouhi) and Valeria (Eliza Pryor).
2	2	"Invasion of the Lumberjerks"	Bob Koherr	Pamela Eells O'Connell	September 23, 2019
Pico Middle School is hosting a campsite setup competition for the wilderness clubs, including the Lumberjacks, the Pico Porcupines hated rivals. Principal Dana gives Kaylie an ultimatum, keep the Porcupines and the Lumberjacks from fighting or the court gets a bad report on her community service.
3	3	"Lights, Camera, Retraction"	Bob Koherr	Tracy Bitterolf	September 23, 2019
Kaylie's mom forces her to skip a wilderness club meeting to promote a new line of products to a magazine, but Ray Ray stows away and tells the reporter he is the designer. Meanwhile, the rest of the Porcupines tries to cover for Kaylie with Principal Dana.
4	4	"Cut It Out!"	Bob Koherr	Mike Montesano & Ted Zizik	September 23, 2019
When Kaylie's reality show cameras catch an embarrassing secret of Jackie's, Kaylie tries to delete the footage before the show airs. Meanwhile, Valeria sells Chewy a love potion to finally win Amber's heart.
5	5	"Wax On, Wax Off"	Rich Correll	Crystal Shaw King	September 23, 2019
Kaylie is getting a statue in a famous wax museum, but the unveiling takes place at the same time as a wilderness club cooking competition. The Porcupines steal her statue to fool the visually challenged judge.
Part 2
6	1	"Winging It"	Rich Correll	Shilpi Roy	December 2, 2019
Chewy uses a birdwatching expedition to try to finally get Amber to love him. Kaylie enlists Ray Ray and Valeria to plan an epic entrance to an upcoming awards show.
7	2	"Ship Out of Luck"	Bob Koherr	Tim Pollock & Jeff Hodsden	December 2, 2019
Kaylie and Amber's inability to cooperate leads to the Porcupines being stranded on an island. Meanwhile, Chewy and Valeria find a chest buried on the island.
8	3	"The Fundrager"	Shannon Flynn	Peri Lapidus and Adam Lapidus	December 2, 2019
9	4	"Party Pooperazzi"	Robbie Countryman	Pang-Ni L. Vogt and Aaron Vaccaro	December 2, 2019
10	5	"Swing and a Mess"	Robbie Countryman	Omar Ponce	December 2, 2019
11	6	"A Very Konrad Kristmas"	David Kendall	Tracy Bitterolf	December 2, 2019
Part 3
12	1	"An Ex to Grind"	Phill Lewis	Mike Montesano & Ted Zizik	February 3, 2020
13	2	"The Old Witcheroo"	Phill Lewis	Peri Lapidus & Adam Lapidus	February 3, 2020
14	3	"19 is the New 15"	David Kendall	Pang-Ni L. Vogt & Aaron Vaccaro	February 3, 2020
15	4	"Pod Awful"	Shannon Flynn	Jeff Hodsden & Tim Pollock	February 3, 2020
16	5	"Warlocks & Headlocks"	Jody Margolin Hahn	Pamela Eells O'Connell	February 3, 2020
17	6	"Fears of a Clown"	Kelly Park	Jeff Hodsden & Tim Pollock	February 3, 2020
18	7	"Purr-fect Harmony"	Kelly Park	Peri Lapidus & Adam Lapidus	February 3, 2020
19	8	"Crossing Wires"	Lauren Breiting	Jonah Kuehner & Nick Geisler	February 3, 2020
20	9	"Bridge Over Troubled Daughter"	Robbie Countryman	Mike Montesano & Ted Zizik	February 3, 2020

== Release ==
Team Kaylie was released on September 23, 2019 on Netflix.
