= Secrets of Sulphur Springs =

American mystery drama television series (2021–2023)

- Genre: Drama; Mystery; Time travel
- Created by: Tracey Thomson
- Starring: Preston Oliver; Kyliegh Curran; Elle Graham; Madeleine McGraw; Landon Gordon; Kelly Frye; Josh Braaten; Diandra Lyle
- Composer: Pieter Schlosser
- Country of origin: United States
- Original language: English
- No. of seasons: 3
- No. of episodes: 27

Production
- Executive producers: Tracey Thomson; Charles Pratt Jr.; R. Lee Fleming Jr.
- Producers: Elena Song; Ian Watermeier; Paige Pemberton; Paul B. Uddo
- Camera setup: Single-camera
- Running time: 21–29 minutes
- Production company: Gwave Productions

Original release
- Network: Disney Channel
- Release: January 15, 2021 – May 5, 2023

Secrets of Sulphur Springs is an American time-travel mystery thriller drama television series which aired on Disney Channel from January 15, 2021 to May 5, 2023. Created by writer Tracey Thomson, who also serves as an executive producer alongside Charles Pratt Jr., the series is set in the fictional Louisiana town of Sulphur Springs. In January 2024, the series was canceled after three seasons. It is Disney Channel's first horror series.

== Plot ==
12-year-old Griffin Campbell and his family move into the closed down and dilapidated Tremont Hotel in Sulphur Springs, Louisiana, that his father bought without much explanation. The hotel is supposedly haunted by Savannah Dillon, a camper at the Tremont Camp who disappeared thirty years ago. With his new best friend Harper from his new school, Griffin discovers a portal which takes the two back in time 30 years to 1990, which they use to meet and find out what happened to Savannah Dillon. They try to save Savannah from disappearing.

Season 2 focuses on Harper as she tries to uncover the secrets behind her connections to the Tremont hotel after discovering a photo of her great-grandmother Daisy which leads her to believe that the answers lie in the 1930s. Meanwhile, paranormal activities increase as the Campbells prepare to reopen the hotel, and Savannah tries to help Griffin and Harper uncover the secrets of the hotel from the past.

Season 3 focuses on an evil new ghost haunting the Tremont hotel and Griffin and Harper must defeat it to prevent them from facing a bleak future that could tear both of their families apart.

== Cast and characters ==
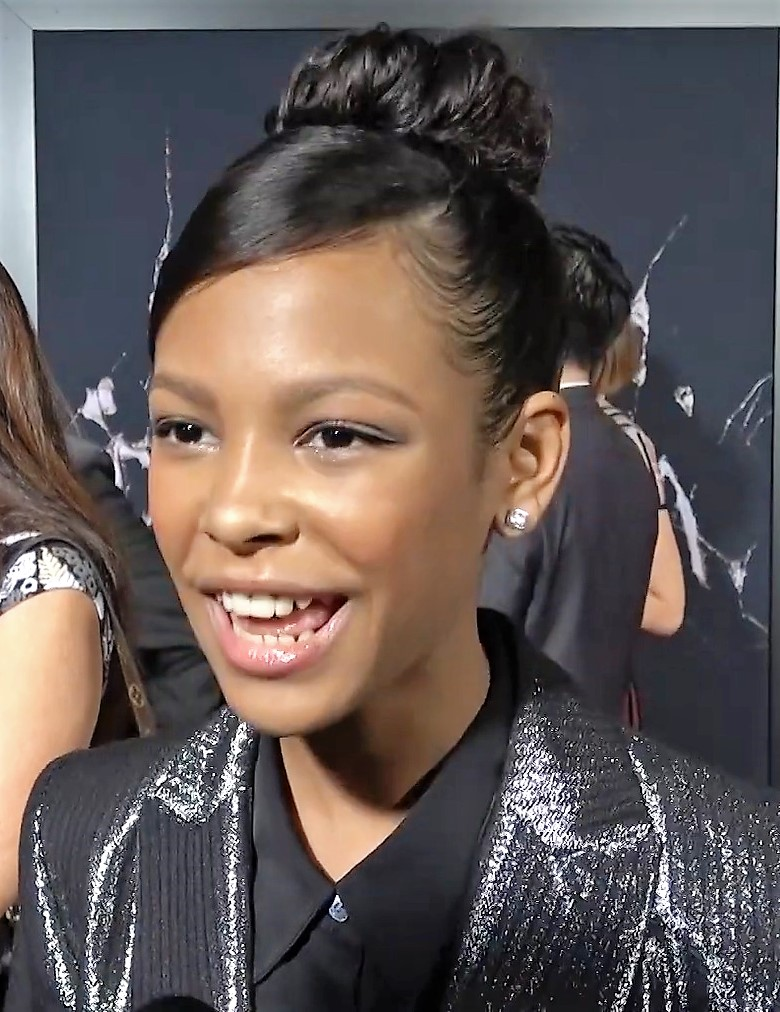
Kyliegh Curran as Harper Marie Dunn

=== Main ===
- Preston Oliver as Griffin Campbell, a young boy whose family moves from Chicago into the Tremont Hotel which is supposedly haunted by Savannah Dillon
- Kyliegh Curran as Harper Marie Dunn, Griffin's new best friend who is excited to learn if the rumors about Savannah are true and help Griffin find out
  - Curran also portrays Harper's great-grandmother Daisy Tremont as a young girl
- Elle Graham as Savannah Dillon, the girl who mysteriously disappeared thirty years prior to the series' start
- Madeleine McGraw as Zoey Campbell, Griffin's younger sister and Wyatt's twin
- Landon Gordon as Wyatt Campbell, Griffin's younger brother and Zoey's twin
- Kelly Frye as Sarah Campbell, Griffin's mother
- Josh Braaten as Bennett "Ben" Campbell Jr., Griffin's father who is hiding a secret from his family
  - Jake Melrose portrays him as a young boy in season 1
- Diandra Lyle as Jessica "Jess" Dunn, (seasons 2–3; recurring season 1), Harper's mother
  - Izabela Rose plays her as a young girl in season 1

=== Recurring ===
- Bryant Tardy (season 1) and Johari Washington (seasons 2–3) as Topher Dunn, Harper's younger brother
- Jim Gleason as Bennett Campbell Sr., Griffin, Zoey, and Wyatt's grandfather
- Trina LaFargue as Becky, counselor of camp Tremont
- Sherri Marina as Mrs. Douglas (season 1), teacher at Sulphur Springs Middle School
- Jillian Batherson as Caroline, Savannah's adoptive mother from 1962
- Ethan Hutchison as Sam Tremont (season 2), Daisy's younger brother
  - Eugene Byrd portrays Sam as an adult in 1962
- Robert Manning Jr. as Elijah Tremont (season 2), Daisy's father
- Garrett Kruithof as Judge Walker (seasons 2–3)
- Jaidyn Triplett as Ruby (season 3)
  - Joyce Guy portrays Ruby as an adult
- Ashley B. Jones as Adult Daisy (season 3)

== Episodes ==
=== Series overview ===
Season	Episodes	Originally released	
Season	Episodes	First released	Last released
1	11	January 15, 2021	March 12, 2021
2	8	January 14, 2022	February 25, 2022
3	8	March 24, 2023	May 5, 2023

=== Season 1 (2021) ===
No. overall	No. in season	Title	Directed by	Written by	Original release date	Prod. code	U.S. viewers (millions)
1	1	"Once Upon a Time"	Jennifer Phang	Tracey Thomson	January 15, 2021	101	0.52
Griffin Campbell and his family have moved from Chicago to the town of Sulphur Springs. His father, Bennett, lived there and had them move into the Tremont, an abandoned hotel that is supposedly haunted by a girl named Savannah who disappeared thirty years ago. Griffin meets and befriends a girl at his new school named Harper who is obsessed with the legend of Savannah. Harper and her classmates believe that Savannah's ghost exists. Griffin invites her to the Tremont for dinner and they explore the basement where they find a hidden door that leads to a nuclear fallout shelter. Upon passing through the hatch, they spot Savannah playing with other children. They then see that the spring is no longer dried up and that the Tremont is now lush and new. A young boy brushes by Griffin and he identifies him as his father. Guest stars: Bryant Tardy as Topher, Jake Melrose as Young Ben, Jim Gleason as Bennett Sr., Chloe Guidry as Quinn
2	2	"Somewhere in Time"	Fred Gerber	Tracey Thomson	January 15, 2021	102	0.52
Griffin and Harper rush back to the shelter and return to their own time. Harper's mother, Jess, and brother, Topher, arrive to pick up Harper. Jess is revealed to believe in the Tremont's curse and shows some animosity towards Bennett. At school the next day, Harper tells Griffin that her mother does not want her to be friends with him and later witnesses Jess and Bennett having a terse conversation. Griffin's younger siblings, Zoey and Wyatt, believe that Savannah's ghost is haunting the Tremont, but Bennett does not want to hear any more of it, appearing reluctant to talk about it. In the middle of the night, Griffin goes back down through the shelter and meets up with Harper who snuck out of her home to go back with him. They wander through the woods and witness Savannah doing something, but before she can, something causes her to scream. Guest stars: Diandra Lyle as Jess, Bryant Tardy as Topher, Jake Melrose as Young Ben, Jim Gleason as Bennett Sr., Chloe Guidry as Quinn
3	3	"Straight Outta Time"	Fred Gerber	Charles Pratt Jr.	January 15, 2021	103	0.52
Savannah is startled by a young Bennett and the two are revealed to be friends. Griffin and Harper introduce themselves as "Harry and Hermione" and help them with a prank. They then return to their time. The next morning, Bennett is breaking down a wall and finds a hidden room with radio equipment. When Griffin turns on one of them, it plays a song that disturbs Bennett. Griffin and Harper return to the past and interact with Savannah and Bennett again, also meeting a young Jess who holds some animosity towards Savannah while liking Bennett. Griffin decides to tell his mother Sarah about what he knows, but she does not believe him and tells him to stop seeing Harper. Harper asks Jess if she went to camp, but she claims that she did not which confuses her. At night, Harper goes to see Griffin and they feel a ghostly presence in the Tremont. Guest stars: Diandra Lyle as Jess, Izabela Rose as Young Jess, Bryant Tardy as Topher, Jake Melrose as Young Ben
4	4	"Time to Face the Music"	Patricia Cardoso	Lindsey Klingele	January 22, 2021	104	0.40
Griffin's grandfather, Bennett Sr., arrives and makes it apparent that he is disappointed with Bennett's decision to move the family back to the Tremont. Zoey and Wyatt discover an old camcorder and visit Topher so that they can use it to catch Savannah's ghost on video. Traveling to the past, Griffin befriends young Bennett while Harper begins to suspect that Jess may eventually do something to Savannah. They argue about it, but make up afterwards before skipping school the next day to travel to the past. They go to a talent show where Bennett tries to perform a guitar act, but chokes upon seeing his father who berates him. Savannah does her act, but to everyone's surprise, Bennett wins, implying that Jess rigged it. Bennett Sr. leaves the Tremont. Sarah and Jess find out Griffin and Harper skipped school and they ground them. Guest stars: Diandra Lyle as Jess, Izabela Rose as Young Jess, Bryant Tardy as Topher, Jake Melrose as Young Ben, Jim Gleason as Bennett Sr.
5	5	"Parsley, Sage, Rosemary and Time"	Patricia Cardoso	R. Lee Fleming Jr.	January 29, 2021	105	0.42
Close to the day of Savannah's disappearance, Griffin and Harper still plan to travel back in time. Harper has Topher cover for her as she leaves home. As Zoey and Wyatt hold a séance for Savannah, Griffin and Harper go and meet with Savannah and Jess respectively. Griffin tries showing a news report to Savannah, but his tablet has died due to the time travel. Harper thinks that Jess is about to do something bad to Savannah as she suddenly becomes suspicious of her. At the dance, Griffin and Harper keep an eye on everyone and Jess reveals that she has a cassette tape she wants to play. As she goes to dance with Bennett, Savannah asks out Bennett first, embarrassing her. Afterwards, Jess blames Harper for ruining her chance with Bennett. Outside the Tremont, a hooded figure watches the events unfold. Guest stars: Diandra Lyle as Jess, Izabela Rose as Young Jess, Bryant Tardy as Topher, Jake Melrose as Young Ben
6	6	"Time Warped"	Robert J. Metoyer	Elena Song	February 5, 2021	106	0.48
Griffin and Harper try to locate Savannah before she disappears. They run into Jess and try to explain themselves, but she has them caught by management though they escape anyway. Savannah cannot understand why Jess dislikes her and she gets dared to sleep in the basement at the Tremont. Zoey and Wyatt attempt to contact Savannah's spirit, but get frightened away by Griffin and Harper. Realizing that Savannah is still missing in the present, they try going through the portal again, but a city-wide blackout prevents them from traveling back. Jess learns that Harper snuck out and Zoey and Wyatt discover that Griffin is gone. They tell Bennett that they saw Savannah's ghost and he seems to believe them. Griffin and Harper are caught by their parents and Savannah heads to the basement of the Tremont. Guest stars: Diandra Lyle as Jess, Jake Melrose as Young Ben, Izabela Rose as Young Jess, Bryant Tardy as Topher
7	7	"Long Time Gone"	Robert J. Metoyer	Katherine Kearns	February 12, 2021	107	0.38
Griffin and Harper are grounded by their respective parents. Harper manages to get Jess to finally admit that she went to camp with Savannah and that she was there the day she disappeared. As the power in Sulphur Springs comes back on, Griffin gets Harper to come back to the Tremont to go rescue Savannah. Jess quickly finds out and she and Topher arrive and call the police. Zoey and Wyatt show Topher the footage they found. In the past, Griffin and Harper are recognized as the unlisted children and are trapped in a police car. As the people go looking for Savannah, Bennett goes to the basement where Jess confronts him and they argue. Afterwards, Bennett Sr. tells his son to never speak of the incident as Harper and Griffin hear from the police car and believe that Bennett is behind Savannah's disappearance. Guest stars: Diandra Lyle as Jess, Jake Melrose as Young Ben, Izabela Rose as Young Jess, Bryant Tardy as Topher, Jim Gleason as Bennett Sr.
8	8	"If I Could Turn Back Time"	Mary Lou Belli	Tracey Thomson	February 19, 2021	108	0.54
Despite Bennett's confession, Harper points out that the cause of Savannah's disappearance has not been explained. Griffin and Harper escape the police car after tricking a police officer. After escaping, they confront Jess in one of the bunkhouses, where Jess reveals about the dare she gave Savannah on the night of the camp dance. Griffin and Harper then investigate the Tremont's basement, deducing that Savannah could have possibly found the portal. When they enter the portal, they find themselves in the year 1960, prior to the camp's opening. They enter the hotel and find Savannah who was under the impression that she was being pranked. Griffin and Harper try to help Savannah back to hatch, but a tree branch falls before Savannah could reach it. Guest stars: Diandra Lyle as Jess, Bryant Tardy as Topher, Izabela Rose as Young Jess
9	9	"As Time Goes By"	Mary Lou Belli	Elena Song	February 26, 2021	109	0.52
In the present, Griffin's family begins to be disturbed by strange events and they call the police. Griffin and Harper are forced to leave Savannah behind after the hatch fails to open. The police find a boot print that matches Harper's foot size, leading to a detection dog finding the hatch. However, Griffin and Harper return the present before the police can find it. While researching on the storm, Griffin learns that his family plans to return to Chicago. Harper goes to school early the next day and searches through its inventory of microfilms where she learns that Savannah was present at The Tremont's grand opening in 1962. She tries to convince Griffin to return to 1960 with her, but is unsuccessful as Griffin was moving away. At Savannah's treehouse, Bennett describes the events leading up to Savannah's disappearance to Sarah. Guest stars: Diandra Lyle as Jess, Bryant Tardy as Topher, Izabela Rose as Young Jess, Jake Melrose as Young Ben
10	10	"No Time Like The Present"	Charles Pratt Jr.	R. Lee Fleming Jr.	March 5, 2021	110	0.47
Following the messages, Griffin and Harper discover a way to change the year the portal brings them to. They visit the year 1962, following the reopening of the Tremont. Griffin and Harper try to be allowed inside, but Harper is denied due to her race. As Griffin and Harper talk, Savannah finds them and approaches them. She describes her life in the two years after she last saw Griffin and Harper. The duo reveal their true identities and try to persuade Savannah to return with them, but she refuses as she finally found a loving family after spending years as an orphan. However, she comes up with an idea to leave a message for present Bennett through a paint can. Bennett becomes emotional after finding the message and receiving closure about Savannah. After previously eavesdropping on Bennett's phone call, Sarah changes her mind and decides for the family to remain in Sulphur Springs. After thinking about her father, Harper uses the portal to travel to 2011 to meet him before his death. As Zoey and Wyatt walk through the hotel, one of the rocking chairs begins to move on its own. Guest stars: Diandra Lyle as Jess, Bryant Tardy as Topher, Jermaine Williams as Chris Dunn
11	11	"Time After Time"	Charles Pratt Jr.	Charles Pratt Jr.	March 12, 2021	111	0.58
In 2011, Harper finds her father and helps him avoid a traffic accident. Harper tells Griffin that she believes she had saved her father, but her father is nowhere to be found when she returns the present. Through her old paintings, she realizes that her father had actually died in a canoeing accident; due to her trauma, she misremembered his cause of death. Zoey and Wyatt unsuccessfully attempt to show Griffin a strange rocking chair in their house. Griffin follows footsteps that begin to appear in the ground into the basement where he finds Harper sulking. Savannah suddenly bursts in, calling for Griffin and Harper's help as she discovered a peculiar photograph of a girl that looks exactly like Harper, except the photo dates from 1930. The trio investigate The Tremont in 1930 when it was still a farmhouse. They quickly rush back to the entrance when they find an old man upstairs. Just as Harper opens the door, she comes face-to-face with the girl in the photograph. Guest star: Diandra Lyle as Jess

=== Season 2 (2022) ===
No. overall	No. in season	Title	Directed by	Written by	Original release date	Prod. code	U.S. viewers (millions)
12	1	"Only Time Will Tell"	Charles Pratt Jr.	Tracey Thomson	January 14, 2022	201	0.64
Sarah is startled by Bennett while investigating a humming noise. Meanwhile in 1930, Griffin, Harper and Savannah quickly leave the house before the girl's father comes downstairs. Sam, the girl's brother whose name is revealed to be Daisy, chases after the trio, only finding Harper's dropped bracelet. Harper hypothesizes that she and Daisy are related. Griffin convinces his father to move the mirror to the basement. Harper opens a chest Jess had inherited from Harper's grandmother, surprised by her findings. Savannah discovers ominous footprints. Griffin tries to contact the ghost through the mirror before being interrupted by a call from Harper, who confirms Daisy is her great-grandmother. They return to 1930 at the instruction of the ghost. There, they observe a woman humming the same tune Sarah had heard. In 1962, Savannah investigates The Tremont's basement when a man enters. After he leaves, she scrutinizes something he had dropped. Harper and Griffin eavesdrop on Daisy discussing her encounter with her family. While leaving, they realize that the woman is looking at them from an upstairs window, who screams before vanishing. They stumble upon her tombstone, revealing the ghost to be actually Daisy's mother Grace. Guest stars: Ethan Hutchison as Young Sam, Robert Manning Jr. as Elijah, Eugene Byrd as Moss Man
13	2	"No Time to Waste"	Charles Pratt Jr.	Charles Pratt Jr.	January 14, 2022	202	0.55
The twins associate the hotel's torn wallpaper with ghosts. In the morning, they are spooked by an old woman outside who disappears. Harper and Griffin return to 1930, unaware that Daisy spots them in front of the hatch. Savannah learns that the man from the night before is an older Sam, who is now a maintenance worker. In 1930, Harper and Griffin, posing as Daisy and a new neighbor, learn that Sam is trying to build a time machine. When Sam inquires about Harper's clothing, the duo realize that Daisy must have had seen them earlier. They return to the present and reach Daisy, briefly explaining the situation. Daisy takes Harper's place in the present so that Harper can investigate in the past. Harper instructs Griffin to monitor Daisy and protect her identity. Savannah discovers Sam's hidden room when the power goes out. Topher discovers the shelter where the time portal is, unwittingly removing the crystal that powers it which strands Daisy and Harper in different time periods. Guest stars: Eugene Byrd as Sam, Robert Manning Jr. as Elijah, Ethan Hutchison as Young Sam, Johari Washington as Topher
14	3	"Time Out"	Kristin Windell	R. Lee Fleming Jr.	January 21, 2022 (Note: This episode was first released on Disney+ on January 19, 2022.)	203	0.49
Topher escapes and hides from Daisy and Griffin who are heading for the portal. Griffin then discovers the crystal had gone missing. Savannah continues to investigate Sam's daily activities. Sarah tries to convince Bennett that there is a ghost haunting them. Harper leaves a note under a floorboard pleading for help, hoping that Griffin and Daisy may find it in the present. Daisy and Harper try to become accustomed to each other's routines. Harper experiences strange visions she previously saw which runs in her family. Savannah is made aware of the others' predicament after finding Harper's note. In the present, Griffin receives Savannah's note that she placed under the same floorboard in 1962, explaining that the "Moss Man" is an older Sam. While eating with Daisy's father Elijah and Sam, Harper discovers she had burnt some soup. As she peers into the pot, she experiences the same strange visions. Topher notices the crystal glowing brightly in his bag. Savannah tries to use the portal when Sam catches her intruding. Topher loses the crystal while running through a forest. Guest stars: Eugene Byrd as Sam, Ethan Hutchison as Young Sam, Johari Washington as Topher
15	4	"Wrong Place, Wrong Time"	Kristin Windell	Lindsey Klingele	January 28, 2022	204	0.29
Topher ditches the crystal and runs home. Griffin suggests that Sam may have had a role in creating the portal. Harper searches for the hatch, unaware of a presence observing her. Savannah tries to ask Sam questions but Sam scolds and chases her out for snooping. Sarah and Bennett discover the springs have been refilled, believing this to be good luck. The twins agree to create a blog detailing their experiences at the Tremont. Sarah and Bennett are driving an enthusiastic reporter out of the hotel when Bennett's father enters. Harper continues experiencing the strange visions. She also learns that Elijah has been receiving offers to sell the farm. Bennett's father offers to help renovate the Tremont. Daisy, tired of pretending as Harper, tries to hint something to Harper's teacher. Savannah pushes for Sam to finish building the time machine, using Harper's note as proof of her time travels. Younger Sam casts his suspicions that Harper is pretending to be Daisy. While at the springs, Bennett discovers the crystal Topher had dropped. Guest stars: Eugene Byrd as Sam, Robert Manning Jr. as Elijah, Ethan Hutchison as Young Sam, Johari Washington as Topher, Jim Gleason as Bennett Sr.
16	5	"It's About Time"	Morenike Joela Evans	Carmen Corea	February 4, 2022	205	0.27
Savannah implores Sam to finish constructing the time machine. Bennett shows the twins the crystal. Daisy and Griffin deduce that Topher is hiding something. Harper and Sam come across judge Walker who is offering to buy Elijah's farm when she suddenly experiences the strange visions once more, believing that Walker has sinister intentions. Harper's family continues to be suspicious of Daisy. Griffin learns that the twins have the crystal and tries to get it back. He calls Daisy, unaware that Topher is eavesdropping. Sam tries to convince Elijah to not sell the farm, though he concedes after Harper tells him about her visions. Griffin and Daisy look for the crystal at the Tremont where they find Topher also searching. Sam storms out when the machine fails. Upset, Savannah hits the machine and it suddenly begins to power up. To Harper's relief, Savannah reaches her. By chance, Griffin is able to find the crystal which was hidden under Wyatt's hat. When he inspects it, he notices the crack caused by the twins. Guest stars: Eugene Byrd as Sam, Robert Manning Jr. as Elijah, Ethan Hutchison as Young Sam, Johari Washington as Topher, Jim Gleason as Bennett Sr.
17	6	"Crunch Time"	Morenike Joela Evans	Caroline Renard	February 11, 2022	206	0.34
Daisy's family learns that Walker edited the agreement without their knowledge, bringing Harper and Savannah to the realization that Grace wants them to stop this to prevent the loss of the family's home. Daisy tells Griffin that she wants to stay and help Grace despite his complaints. Their return attempt to the past fails after Bennett's father causes a power surge. Smoke begins to form in The Tremont, and the family evacuates. Harper and Savannah hatch a plan to retrieve the real, unedited agreement from Walker's office. After The Tremont's electricity comes back on, Griffin sends Daisy back through the portal. As Harper and Savannah reunite with Daisy, Harper comes up with a new idea. Guest stars: Eugene Byrd as Sam, Robert Manning Jr. as Elijah, Ethan Hutchison as Young Sam, Johari Washington as Topher, Jim Gleason as Bennett Sr.
18	7	"Check-out Time"	Robert J. Metoyer	Charles Pratt Jr.	February 18, 2022	207	0.33
Harper convinces Daisy to let the timeline play itself out in order to preserve it. Savannah learns of Sam's injuries and visits him. Harper hypothesizes that the smoke incident could be related to her visions. In the present, Harper shows Griffin the real agreement signed by Elijah, stating the Tremont's land is rightfully owned by Harper's family hence explaining Grace's presence. Daisy encourages Sam to never give up on building the time machine. Savannah searches for Sam after learning he had left. Harper and Griffin tell everyone about the Tremont's true ownership using the agreement as proof. Jess concedes and agrees to co-own the Tremont alongside Griffin's parents. Savannah finds a note left by Sam, instructing her to destroy the machine if he does not return after 3 weeks. As Harper and Griffin tell Grace that they accomplished her request, the mirror shatters and Grace's spirit floats upstairs. The duo, along with the twins and Topher, chases after her. They stand by and watch as she flies higher and dissipates. Later that night, strange red light begins to emit from room 205. Guest stars: Eugene Byrd as Sam, Ethan Hutchison as Young Sam, Johari Washington as Topher
19	8	"Time Is Not On Our Side"	Robert J. Metoyer	Tracey Thomson	February 25, 2022	208	0.19
As Harper and Griffin prepare for The Tremont's grand opening, they encounter the mysterious woman who has been tormenting the twins. They visit her at a nursing home, where she addresses them as "Harry and Hermione" leading them to speculate that she is an elderly Savannah. Savannah visits the present and tells Griffin and Harper of Sam's disappearance. However, Griffin urges her to return to the past as the crystal powering the portal was in danger of breaking. A leak begins to form in The Tremont which everyone attempts to stop. At the same time, a black and viscous substance begins to seep out of room 205. Harper and Savannah reach the shelter, noting Griffin's strange absence upstairs. They discover the crystal split in two, stranding Savannah in the present and Griffin in the future. Bennett notices the shattered mask in the basement and the mask Savannah dropped, leading him to discover the shelter. As Savannah weeps, Bennett enters the shelter and confronts Harper. In the future, Griffin tries to stop a fire ravaging The Tremont but is stopped by an older Sam. Guest stars: Eugene Byrd as Sam, Johari Washington as Topher

=== Season 3 (2023) ===
No. overall	No. in season	Title	Directed by	Written by	Original release date	Prod. code	U.S. viewers (millions)
20	1	"Time Won't Let Me"	Robert J. Metoyer	Tracey Thomson	March 24, 2023	301	0.19
Guest stars: Eugene Byrd as Sam, Johari Washington as Topher, Charlie Talbert as Lester
21	2	"Time in a Crystal"	Robert J. Metoyer	Charles Pratt Jr.	March 24, 2023	302	0.20
Guest stars: Eugene Byrd as Sam, Johari Washington as Topher, Jillian Batherson as Caroline, Charlie Talbert as Lester
22	3	"Closing Time"	Morenike Joela Evans	Caroline Renard	March 31, 2023 (Note: This episode was first released on Disney+ on March 25, 2023.)	303	0.10
Guest stars: Eugene Byrd as Sam, Johari Washington as Topher, Jillian Batherson as Caroline
23	4	"Bad Judge of Time"	Morenike Joela Evans	R. Lee Fleming, Jr	April 7, 2023	304	0.13
Guest stars: Eugene Byrd as Sam, Jaidyn Triplett as Ruby, Johari Washington as Topher, Garrett Kruithof as Judge Walker, Mickie Pollock as Mrs. Barker
24	5	"Time Waits for No One"	Kristin Windell	Carmen Rose Corea	April 14, 2023	305	0.13
Guest stars: Eugene Byrd as Sam, Jaidyn Triplett as Ruby, Johari Washington as Topher, Garrett Kruithof as Judge Walker
25	6	"Time Reveals All"	Kristin Windell	Lindsey Klingele	April 21, 2023	306	0.08
Guest stars: Eugene Byrd as Sam, Joyce Guy as Adult Ruby, Jaidyn Triplett as Ruby, Johari Washington as Topher, Garrett Kruithof as Judge Walker
26	7	"Scream Time"	Charles Pratt Jr.	Avery Girion & R. Lee Fleming, Jr	April 28, 2023	307	0.13
Guest stars: Eugene Byrd as Sam, Joyce Guy as Adult Ruby, Jaidyn Triplett as Ruby, Johari Washington as Topher, Garrett Kruithof as Judge Walker
27	8	"Nick of Time"	Charles Pratt Jr.	Charles Pratt Jr. & Tracey Thomson	May 5, 2023	308	0.18
Guest stars: Eugene Byrd as Sam, Joyce Guy as Adult Ruby, Johari Washington as Topher, Garrett Kruithof as Judge Walker, Jillian Batherson as Caroline, Riley Looc as Nick

== Production ==
Originally titled Sulphur Springs, the project was developed as a pilot for Disney Channel; it was later pitched to Disney+, where it received a cast-contingent series order. The series entered pre-production, but the casting process was unsuccessful and Disney+ passed on the series. By May 2019, development for the series had moved from the streaming service back to Disney Channel, and casting continued for the series, now being produced as a pilot; two roles had been filled by this point. Originally developed as an hour-long series, the program was later shortened to a half-hour format. In October 2019, the series was officially ordered by the network for an eleven-episode season.

Production was scheduled to begin in New Orleans in 2020. Filming commenced in Louisiana towards the end of 2019 and paused on February 23, 2020, due to the COVID-19 pandemic in Louisiana. Filming for the season was completed between October 5 and November 6, 2020. On April 23, 2021, the series was renewed for a second season, which premiered on January 14, 2022. On February 7, 2022, the series was renewed for a third season, which premiered on March 24, 2023.

On January 30, 2024, it was reported that the series had been canceled after three seasons.

== Broadcast ==
In the United States, the series premiered with three episodes combined into a one-hour special, airing on Disney Channel on January 15, 2021. Episodes continued to air weekly on the network, each Friday until March 12, 2021.

In a first for a Disney Channel series, the program received a "high-profile" release schedule on Disney+. The first five episodes were made available on the streaming service on February 26, 2021. Episodes continued to be added each Friday until April 9, 2021.

== Reception ==
=== Ratings ===
Viewership and ratings per season of Secrets of Sulphur Springs
Season	Episodes	First aired		Last aired		Avg. viewers (millions)
Season	Episodes	Date	Viewers (millions)	Date	Viewers (millions)	Avg. viewers (millions)
1	11	January 15, 2021	0.52	March 12, 2021	0.58	0.48
2	8	January 14, 2022	0.64	February 25, 2022	0.19	0.39
3	8	March 24, 2023	0.19	May 5, 2023	0.18	0.14

=== Awards and nominations ===
Year	Award	Category	Recipient	Result	Ref.
2022	Children's and Family Emmy Awards	Outstanding Children's or Family Viewing Series	Secrets of Sulphur Springs	Nominated	
