= The Winnie Years =

Children's fiction novel series by Lauren Myracle

- Cover of Twelve, the third in the series.
- Ten, Eleven, Twelve, Thirteen, Thirteen Plus One
- Author: Lauren Myracle
- Country: United States
- Language: English
- Genre: Children's fiction
- Publisher: Dutton Juvenile
- Published: 2004 - 2011
- Media type: Print

The Winnie Years is a series of children's fiction novels by American author Lauren Myracle. The first entry in the series, Eleven, was published on February 9, 2004, through Dutton Juvenile and focuses on the angst and everyday problems of tween Winnie Perry.

Of the books in the series, Myracle stated that they were her "most autobiographical books" in that she drew heavily upon her own experiences as a tween. The author has admitted that her son Jamie is the basis for the character of Ty, Winnie's younger brother, and that she has plans for a spinoff series surrounding the character. The spinoff series was eventually released and is titled The Life of Ty, which consists of three books that were all released in 2013.

== Series synopsis ==
=== Ten (2011) ===
Ten is a prequel to the series and follows Winnie as she turns ten. Excited over the new responsibilities and changes that will come with her new age, the book chronicles Winnie's adventures and misadventures with her family and friends. Winnie overcomes challenges and really gets a taste of what it's like to be a pre-teen.

=== Eleven (2004) ===
Eleven follows Winnie as she deals with more changes, one of which concerns her best friend Amanda potentially losing interest in their friendship in favor of someone else. On top of this, Winnie also has to deal with her cranky older sister and an ill crush. Sick of the issues and problems that come with getting older, Winnie vows that she won't go through any changes, despite life having other plans for her.

=== Twelve (2007) ===
Twelve follows Winnie as she deals with puberty and other issues. Last year she lost her former best friend Amanda to the school's mean girl, but made a new friend in Dinah. This year she has to deal with issues such as getting her ears pierced, going to junior high, and her feelings over developing breasts and having to go bra shopping with her mother. In this book she also gains another new friend named Cinnamon whom Winnie found interesting because of her more adult-like behavior such as wearing thong underwear.

=== Thirteen (2008) ===
In Thirteen Winnie finds that one of her brother's friends is battling leukemia, prompting her to later donate her hair to Locks of Love. During this time she also finds that it's hard to talk about her changing life, as her friends are either growing up too fast or too slow. In this book, she is dealing with problems about her boyfriend Lars, which eventually he makes up with Winnie.

=== Thirteen Plus One (2010) ===
In Thirteen Plus One Winnie Perry has finally gotten the hang of junior high, gaining two BFF's and a boyfriend in the process. With graduation just around the corner, the countdown to high school has begun. She's made a to-do list before high school, which she completes.

== Bibliography ==
1. Eleven (2004)
2. Twelve (2007)
3. Thirteen (2008)
4. Thirteen Plus One (2010)
5. Ten (2011)

== Reception ==
Critical reception for the series has been mostly positive. Kirkus Reviews has largely praised the series, citing its authenticity as a highlight. The School Library Journal and Horn Book Guide have both given reviews for the series, with the School Library praising most of the books in the series while stating that Ten didn't have the "depth of emotion or tackle some more serious issues as some others do".
