= Luv Ya Bunches =

Book by Lauren Myracle

- First edition, 2009
- Author: Lauren Myracle
- Language: English
- Series: Flower Power
- Genre: Literary fiction
- Publisher: Amulet Books
- Publication date: October 1, 2009
- Publication place: United States
- Media type: Hardcover, Paperback
- Pages: 352 pages
- ISBN: 0-8109-4211-9; 978-0-8109-4211-0

Luv Ya Bunches is a 2009 children's novel by author Lauren Myracle. The book was first published on October 1, 2009 through Amulet Books and focuses on the friendship between four elementary school girls with similar floral themed names. It's very popular among girls ages 9–13, and is known for its girly and interesting story plot.

== Plot summary ==
The book follows a group of fifth-grade girls - Yasaman (meaning "jasmine" in Turkish), Violet, Katie-Rose, and Camilla - all of whom are named after flowers.

Katie-Rose, a Chinese-American girl, is the youngest of three siblings and one of the most unpopular girls in her grade. Her only friend is her neighbor Max, but she yearns for female friends and resolves to grow closer to popular girl Camilla "Milla" Swanson, whom she knows from Pioneer Camp.

Milla is an only child with lesbian moms, Abigail and Joyce. Her best friends are the cruel and popular Modessa and Quin, who often pressure Milla into joining them in bullying others, though Milla does not enjoy doing so. Milla reciprocates Katie-Rose's interest, but is ordered by Modessa not to speak to her. A frequent target of Modessa's bullying is Yasaman, a sweet but clumsy Muslim computer genius. Yasaman's younger sister, Nigar, gets bullied due to her name reading similarly to a racist slur.

Violet is a shy African-American girl who has recently moved to California from Georgia with her father. Her mother has bipolar disorder and has recently been committed to a psychiatric ward following a mental health crisis, causing Violet to feel lonely and outcast. Violet temporarily joins Modessa's clique and befriends Milla.

Yasaman befriends Katie-Rose and introduces her to a social media website she has created, temporarily entitled BlahBlahSomethingSomething.com. Milla, becoming jaded with Modessa’s hostility, begins secretly talking to Katie-Rose, who introduces her to the site.

Milla loses Tally, a bobble-head turtle that she keeps as a good luck charm. Violet finds Tally and hides it in Modessa's seat, assuming the latter will return it. Modessa instead puts Tally in Katie-Rose's backpack to frame her for stealing it, leading to an argument between Katie-Rose and Milla. Despite knowing the truth, Violet does not intervene.

Eventually, Violet tells Milla what happened, and they decide to stop being friends with Modessa and Quin. Together, all four girls seek revenge on the two by putting mud in Modessa’s ice cream and framing Quin for doing so. Their plan succeeds, and Modessa and Quin end up falling out with each other, as well as in trouble with scolding teachers. Milla, Violet, Katie-Rose, and Yasaman find out that they are all named after flowers and dub themselves the "flower friends forever," abbreviated to FFFs. Yasaman renames her website, which all four girls now regularly use to communicate, to "LuvYaBunches.com".

== Reception ==
Critical reception for the book was mostly positive, with Booklist giving it a positive review. Publishers Weekly gave a mixed review of the book, saying that Luv Ya Bunches "sends something of a mixed message about the acceptability of teasing as the girls’ plot their own prank in response to Modessa’s machinations. Still, readers will find the girls’ voices enticing and should be able to relate to their conflicts and inner anxieties."

In an interview with Sue Corbett, Myracle reports that although she receives at least 10 emails bashing her for the content in her books, positive emails out-number and overpower the negative comments. The positive emails, in which her readers compare the content to that found in self-help books, encourage Myracle to continue writing books such as Luv Ya Bunches. In those emails, the readers compliment how the book covers topics their parents typically avoid, such as gender identity.

== Controversy & censorship ==
Luv Ya Bunches has received some controversy over its inclusion of same-sex parents, with Scholastic requesting that Myracle remove the couple and some objectionable language before it could be sold at their book fairs. Myracle removed some of the language, but refused to replace the lesbian couple with a heterosexual one. Scholastic later retracted their statement, saying that they would offer the book at book fairs but would not sell the book at ones held in elementary schools.
