= Randy Bartels =

American investigator

Randy A. Bartels
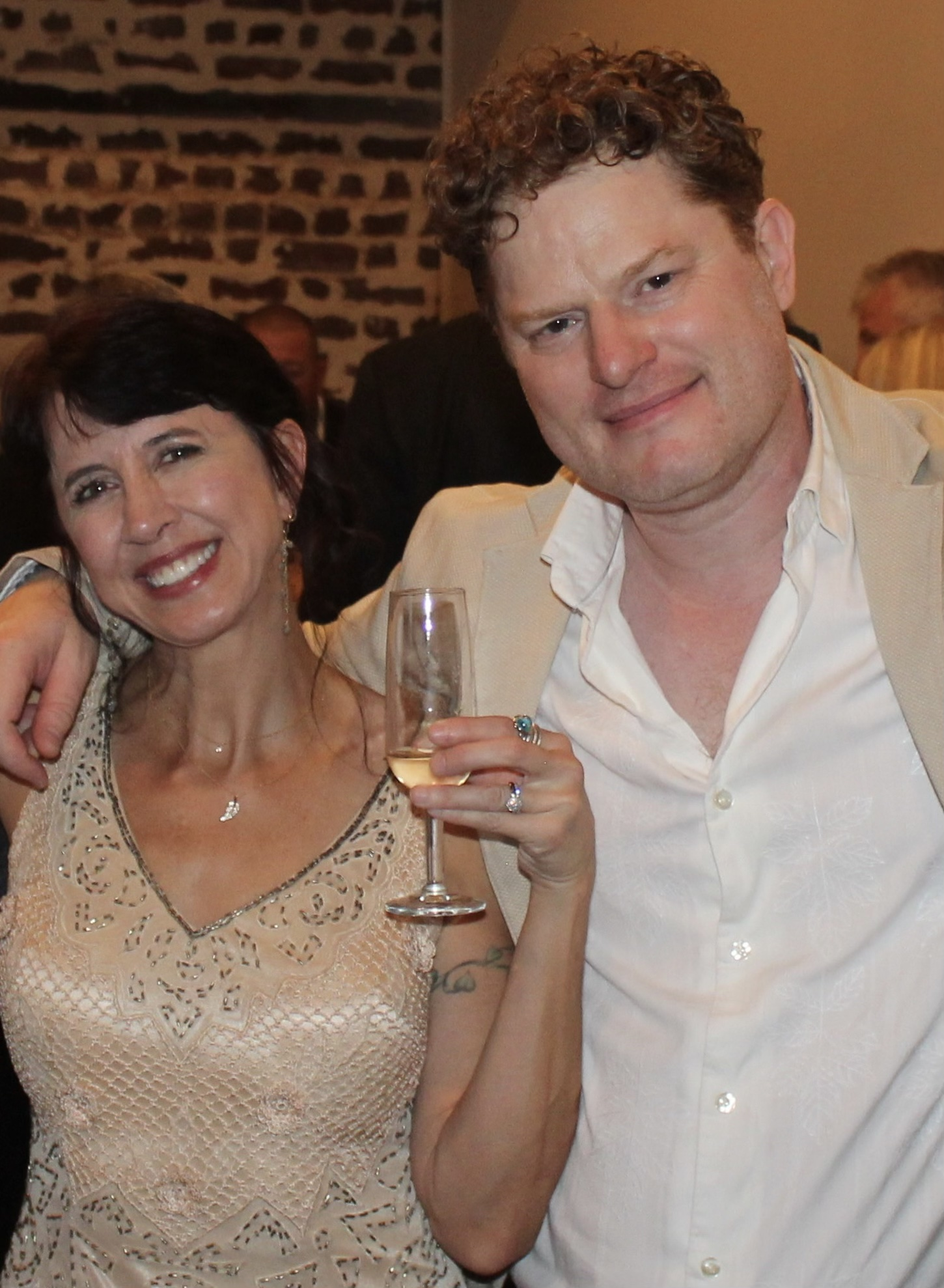
- Bartels with wife Lauren Myracle
- Education: University of Michigan (M.S., Ph.D.) Oklahoma State University (B.S.)
- Spouse: Lauren Myracle
- Scientific career
- Workplaces: Morgridge Institute for Research University of Wisconsin–Madison Colorado State University
- Thesis: Coherent Control of Atoms and Molecules (2002)
- Academic advisors: Margaret Murnane, Henry Kapteyn
- Website: https://morgridge.org/research/labs/bartels/

Randy Alan Bartels is an American investigator at the Morgridge Institute for Research and a professor of Biomedical Engineering at the University of Wisconsin–Madison. He has been awarded the Adolph Lomb Medal from the Optical Society of America, a National Science Foundation CAREER award, a Sloan Research Fellowship in physics, an Office of Naval Research Young Investigator Award, a Beckman Young Investigator Award, and a Presidential Early Career Award for Science and Engineering (PECASE). In 2020 and 2022, he received support from the Chan Zuckerberg Initiative to develop microscope technologies for imaging tissues and cells.

== Early life and education ==
Bartels earned a BS in Electrical and Computer Engineering from Oklahoma State University in 1997. During summer breaks, he participated in research experience for undergraduate programs, studying semiconductor thin film growth and characterization at Iowa State University, fabricating and modeling ion-exchanged waveguides at the Gérard Mourou Center for Ultrafast Optical Science at the University of Michigan, and building quasi-continuous-wave diode pumped solid state lasers at Lawrence Livermore National Laboratory. Bartels received his Ph.D. from the University of Michigan in 2002. After starting his Ph.D. work at the University of Michigan, he moved to JILA in Boulder, CO, where the bulk of his thesis work was performed. He worked on the development of ultrafast lasers, coherent control of quantum systems, and the study of extreme nonlinear optics. This work contributed to the development of attophysics by manipulating the strong-field dynamics of atomic electron wave functions with ~10 attosecond precision. Attosecond physics was recognized by the Nobel Prize in Physics in 2023, conferred to three scientists “for experimental methods that generate attosecond pulses of light for the study of electron dynamics in matter.”

During his graduate career, Bartels was supported by a National Defense Science and Engineering Graduate Fellowship and received the Optical Society of America’s New Focus Student Research Award, and a JILA Scientific Achievement Award, as well as the IEEE Photonics Society Graduate Fellowship.

== Career and research ==
Bartels began his independent research career at Colorado State University, where he was awarded a Monfort Professorship, and held joint appointments in the Department of Chemistry and in the School of Biomedical Engineering. He began working on strong-field control of molecular rotations and vibrations and demonstrated ultra-sensitive detection of molecular coherences for spectroscopy and microscopy. His group developed vacuum ultraviolet light laser sources and optical systems, as well as stable optical comb sources in the mid infrared spectral region.

In 2023, Bartels joined the Morgridge Institute for Research as an Investigator and the University of Wisconsin–Madison as a professor of Biomedical Engineering. His research involves the development of spectroscopy and microscopy techniques and applications and the development of ultrafast fiber lasers for use in these applications.

Bartels is a Fellow of the Optical Society of America and of the American Physical Society. He serves on the Editorial Board of Applied Physics Letters, Photonics, as an editor for Optics Communications, and as an Associate Editor for Science Advances.

== Awards and honors ==
- 2004 National Science Foundation CAREER Award
- 2004 Adolph Lomb Medal from the Optical Society of America, "for pioneering contributions to the coherent control of light, atoms, and molecules, including the shaped-pulse optimization of high order harmonic soft x-ray radiation"
- 2005 Presidential Early Career Award for Scientists and Engineers from the Department of Defense
- 2005 Sloan Research Fellow in Physics
- 2005 Beckman Young Investigator Award from the Arnold and Mabel Beckman Foundation
- 2007 IEEE Photonics Society Young Investigator Award, "for pioneering contributions to ultrafast molecular photonics and photonic reagent control of quantum systems on an unprecedented time-scale"
- 2005 Office of Naval Research Young Investigator Program Award
- 2008 Kavli Fellow, National Academy of Sciences
- 2011 Fellow, Optical Society of America (Optica)
- 2013 Fellow, American Physical Society, "for advances in precision temporal, spatial and spectral control of optical and x-ray pulses, the control of quantum wave packets via sculpted light fields, and optical microscopy"
