= Elaine Kao =

American actress

- Education: University of California, Irvine (BA); California Institute of the Arts (MFA)
- Occupation: Actor
- Website: http://www.elainekao.com

Elaine Kao is a Taiwanese-American theatre, television and film actress, best known for her roles in Bridesmaids (2011), Funny People (2009) and Red Doors (2005).

== Early life and education ==
Kao was raised in the San Fernando Valley. She graduated with a Bachelor of Arts in economics from the University of California, Irvine, and earned her Master of Fine Arts (M.F.A.) in acting from the California Institute of the Arts.

== Career ==
Kao has appeared in films such as Bridesmaids (the woman from the couple in Kristen Wiig's jewelry store), as Julie Wong in Georgia Lee's Red Doors (Best Narrative Feature Award in the NY, NY Competition at the Tribeca Film Festival), Funny People, Home Game (as Gail), the J. J. Abrams-penned TV movie pilot The Catch (as Mrs. Yasasui), and the TV movie Supreme Courtships (as the Doctor).

Kao has also appeared in TV shows such as Snowpiercer (as Anne Roche), Kenan (as Elle), Upside-Down Magic (as Professor Han), No Good Nick (as Ms. Lee), For The People (as Alice Huang), American Koko (as series regular Lucky Ling), Netflix's Disjointed (as Mary), Fresh Off the Boat (as Little Auntie), Hawaii Five-0 (as Dr. Jill Loi), Hart of Dixie (as Sharon), The Comeback (as Chinese Producer), Liv and Maddie (as Sensei Rae Dawn), Incredible Crew (as Mom on the episode "Lunch Boxing"), Entourage (as massage parlor madam Maxie), NCIS: LA (as Xue-Li), Cold Case (as Stacy Lee '09), 24, Eleventh Hour, How I Met Your Mother, The Closer (as An-Li Wong), In Gayle We Trust (as Jill), Grey's Anatomy, Close to Home, Curb Your Enthusiasm (as Kevin Nealon's wife, Miyuki), Six Feet Under (as Courtney), Big Day (as Dr. Yang), Girlfriends (as Sarah) and All-American Girl starring Margaret Cho (as Tammy).

Kao also appeared in a number of short films and independent films, as the female protagonist Mai in Kevin Lau's Made in Chinatown, which won Best Short, Best Writing and Best Actor (Tim Chiou) at the 2013 8th Annual NBC Short Cuts Film Festival, with Kao also winning a Best Actress award for her starring role in that film at the 2013 Asians on Film Festival as well. Susie Choi in Christine Yoo's Wedding Palace, as Marianne Quon/Lai Yee ("The Technicolor Movie Queen" of Chinese Cinema) in Timothy Tau's short film bio-pic Keye Luke, as Delia in Cynthia Liu's "Red Thread," as Linda Ahn in Philip Chung's "A Ribbon of Dreams" and as the Mother in James Huang's "Chapter 21."

She has also provided her voice talents to the Hong Kong underworld video game Jet Li: Rise to Honor starring Jet Li and has also produced Kerri Higuchi's film, Mr. Isaac and a comedy short film entitled The Cure for a Diseased Life directed by Ray Chang. Kao has also appeared in commercials from Target, Microsoft, MasterCard, Dell, Capital One, Travelocity and more.

Kao has also appeared in various theatrical productions from the Lodestone Theatre Ensemble (Tennessee Williams' Suddenly, Last Summer, and as Juliet in Romeo and Juliet), East West Players (as Jing-Mei in EWP's production of The Joy Luck Club and as Rose in EWP's production of Philip Kan Gotanda's Sisters Matsumoto), Company of Angels (as Angie in Vasanti Saxena's Sun Sisters), the Center Theater Group and the Mark Taper Forum (as Hae-Joon in BFE at the New Works Festival), The Sacred Fools Theater Company (as Ching in The Caliban) in Los Angeles, California, as well as South Coast Repertory (in 99 Histories as part of the Pacific Playwrights Festival), the Rude Guerilla Theater (as the Dictator in Howard Barker's Wounds to the Face) The Cleveland Playhouse (as Hannah in Judy Soo Hoo's Solve for X for the Next Stage Festival, opposite Kelvin Han Yee and Roger Fan) and The Met Theater (as Clary, the lead role in Bill's Eye).

== Filmography ==
=== Film ===
Year	Title	Role	Notes
2002	A Ribbon of Dreams	Linda Ahm	
2003	Red Thread	Delia	
2005	The Catch	Mrs. Yasasui	
2006	Red Doors	Julie Wong	
2011	Bridesmaids	Lady in Jewelry store	

=== Television ===
Year	Title	Role	Notes
2008	How I Met Your Mother	Lady in PriceCo grocery store	Episode: "I Heart NJ"
2014	Liv and Maddie	Sensei Rae Dawn	Episode: Slump-A-Rooney
2016	Fresh Off the Boat	Little Auntie	Season 3 Episode 1
2017	Disjointed	Mary Fakename	Episode: "Donna Weed"
2020	Upside-Down Magic	Professor Han	Disney Channel Original Movie
2021	Snowpiercer	Anne Roche	The Snowpiercer TV Series on TNT
2021	Kenan	Elle	Pilot episode
2026	It's Always Sunny in Philadelphia	Professor Lee	Episode: "The Gang Gets Tested"
