= Alison Fernandez =

American child actress

- Occupations: Actress; Model; Cheerleader; Gymnast
- Years active: 2011–present

Alison Fernandez is an American actress, best known for her roles as Lucy Mills in the ABC fantasy drama series Once Upon a Time, Young Jane in The CW comedy-drama Jane the Virgin, Young Eva in flashbacks on the Netflix dramedy Orange Is the New Black, Amber Diaz in the Netflix comedy Team Kaylie, the young mutant Delilah (also known as Ice Girl) in the 2017 superhero film Logan, Lex Roberts in the Freeform movie Life-Size 2 and Pepper Paloma in the Disney Channel Original Movie Upside-Down Magic.

== Early life and career ==
Fernandez played Zara Amaro, Nick Amaro's daughter in Law & Order: Special Victims Unit in 2011. She made her film debut in the 2014 film Teenage Mutant Ninja Turtles as Rosa Mendez.

In 2016 she landed guest starring roles on three shows, Fresh Off the Boat, Another Period and Jane the Virgin. In 2017 she guest starred on Once Upon a Time as Lucy, and then had a regular starring role in the 7th season. She appeared in the X-Men film Logan as Delilah, and recurred on the Netflix dramedy series Orange Is the New Black, having first appeared on the show in 2013.

She co-starred in Freeform's Life-Size 2 in December 2018 opposite Tyra Banks and Francia Raisa. The film was part of the network’s 25 Days of Christmas

Fernandez also landed the role of Amber in Team Kaylie. Then she obtained the role of Pepper Paloma in Upside-Down Magic.

== Filmography ==
=== Films ===
Year	Title	Role	Notes
2014	Teenage Mutant Ninja Turtles	Rosa Mendez	Uncredited
2014	MOMMAP	Amy Garcia	
2016	The Death of Eva Sofia Valdez	Isabel Valdez	
2016	Power Play	Sally	
2016	Only Yesterday	Young Taeko Okajima (voice)	English dub
2016	The Curious Kitty & Friends	Mimmi (voice)	
2017	Logan	Delilah	
2017	An American Girl Story: Summer Camp, Friends for Life	Paz	
2017	Devil's Whisper	Alicia	
2018	Life Size 2	Lex	
2019	Teacher of the Year	Lisa Fennelly	Short film
2020	Cuties	Angelica (Médina El Aidi-Azouni)	English dub
2022	Turning Red	Additional Voices	

=== Television ===
Year	Title	Role	Notes
2011-2015	Law & Order: Special Victims Unit	Zara Amaro	10 episodes; recurring (Seasons 13-16)
2012	Celebrity Ghost Stories	Leticia	Episode: "Dick Cavett/Monica Keena/Ace Young/Paul Iacono"
2013; 2015	Orange Is the New Black	Eva	Episodes: "The Chickening", "Mother's Day", "Bed Bugs and Beyond" and "Trust No Bitch"
2015	One Bad Choice	Catalina	Episode: "Jessica Rasdall"
2016	Clarence	Garotinha (voice)	Episode: "Clarence & Sumo's Rexcellent Adventure"
2016	Fresh Off the Boat	Sharlene	Episodes: "Week in Review" and "Breaking Chains"
2016	Another Period	Ethanney	Episode: "Servants' Disease"
2016-2017	We Bare Bears	Additional voices (voice)	5 episodes; Guest (Seasons 2-3)
2016-2017; 2019	Jane the Virgin	Young Jane	Episodes: "Chapter Thirty-Seven", "Chapter Forty-Nine", "Chapter Sixty" and "Chapter Eighty-Three"
2017-2018	Vampirina	Additional voices (voice)	Episodes: "The Sleepover/Portrait of a Vampire" & "Vee Is For Valentine/Scarestitute Teacher"
2016-2018	Once Upon a Time	Lucy Mills/Lucy Vidrio	24 episodes; Guest (Season 6); Main (Season 7)
2019–2020	Team Kaylie	Amber	20 episodes; Main role
2019	For The People	Emma Collins	Episode: "One Big Happy Family"
2020	Sydney to the Max	Chloe	Episode: "The Lunch Club"
2020	Upside-Down Magic	Pepper Paloma	Disney Channel Original Movie
2021	Raven's Home	Olivia	Episode: "Fresh Off the Note"
