= Ttyl =

2004 novel by Lauren Myracle

ttyl
- Cover of first (hardcover) edition
- Author: Lauren Myracle
- Cover artist: Celina Carvalho; Becky Terhune (design)
- Genre: Young adult fiction, epistolary novel
- Published: April 1, 2004, Harry N. Abrams, Inc., Amulet Books
- Publication place: United States
- Media type: Hardcover
- Pages: 224 pages
- ISBN: 0-8109-4821-4
- Followed by: ttfn

ttyl is a young adult novel written by Lauren Myracle. It is the first book in the 'Internet Girls' series. In 2004, it gained attention for being the first novel written entirely in the style of instant messaging conversation. The novel was a New York Times, Publishers Weekly, and a Book Sense bestseller. "ttyl" is internet slang for "Talk to you later", usually used in texting.

== The series ==
The series includes four books (ttyl; ttfn; l8r, g8r; and yolo), as well as a book companion (bff: a girlfriend book you write together). The series follows best friends Maddie (madmaddie), Angela (SnowAngel), and Zoe (zoegirl) through high school. ttyl, published April 1, 2004 ttfn, published March 1, 2006 l8r, g8r, published March 1, 2007 yolo, published August 26, 2014

== Plot ==
Three friends, Angela Silver (SnowAngel), Zoe Barrett (zoegirl), and Madigan "Maddie" Kinnick (madmaddie) are just starting tenth grade of high school. At the beginning of the book, the trio, who refer to themselves as the "winsome threesome," believe that they will stick together forever. Zoe wants something meaningful and big to happen in her life, Angela knows it is going to be a fabulous year and that she is going to meet the boy of her dreams, and Maddie can't help but feel low and down on herself. When Angela discovers that Rob Tyler is in her French class, she develops a crush on him. Maddie notices how mean Jana Whitaker, the school's queen bee, is to her and to other students. Rob finally asks Angela out and the two have a fun time together, which is how Angela describes it. Later, she reveals to her friends that Rob is "the one", as in the one she goes all the way with. The next day, Angela is unable to go on a planned date with Rob since her mother grounded her for going to a bar without permission. Angela then learns that Rob went out with Tonnie Wyndham while she had to stay home. Rob apologizes and states that Tonnie refused to let him call Angela. Days later, Rob goes on another date (while he was supposed to be on a date with Angela and left her waiting) with Tonnie and says that she asked him out and he didn't know how to say no. Angela breaks up with him after this. Zoe has been experiencing favoritism in one of her classes by a young teacher who gives her special attention. She struggles when the line of appropriateness becomes blurred, she needs her friends a time when Maddie's new friendship with Jana is creating fractures in the friend group. Maddie gives Jana a ride home (when she was supposed to give Angela a ride) and Angela gets mad at her too. For Halloween, the trio plan to go trick or treating as mold, fungus and dust. When Halloween arrives, though, Maddie ditches her friends and doesn't show up. Instead she goes to a party with Jana Whitaker and ends up getting really drunk and taking her shirt off and dancing exposed in front of guys, which Jana photographs without Maddie's permission. They all go through their ups and downs of tenth grade. Will the winsome threesome make it through the year? (as quoted from the book)

== Characters ==
- SnowAngel or Angela is one of the main protagonists and is best friends with Zoe Barrett and Maddie Kinnick. She is supposedly a good friend, but she cannot keep a secret, the one flaw that Maddie constantly brings up. Angela believes that the winsome threesome will always stick together, no matter what. She also states that one of the trio has to be sexually involved with a guy, and just knows that she will be the one. After she breaks up with Rob Tyler, for whom she had strong feelings, she cannot help but miss him. Her second crush, Ben Schlanker, turns out to have a girlfriend named Leslie. Angela has a twelve-year-old sister, Chrissy, whom she finds really annoying.
- MadMaddie or Maddie is one of the main protagonists and is best friends with Angela Silver and Zoe Barrett. She is frequently despondent and suffers from low self-esteem. At first, Maddie thinks of Jana as a mean and bratty person but later befriends her. While at Jana's brother's frat party, Maddie gets drunk and does a table dance in front of everyone with her shirt and bra off. Maddie turns sixteen in the book, unlike Zoe and Angela, who are fifteen. Maddie wants her boyfriend Ian to kiss her, but Ian never makes a move, and she is too nervous to make a move herself. She has an eighteen-year-old brother named Mark.
- Zoegirl or Zoe is one of the main protagonists and is best friends with Angela and Maddie. She is described as smart and kind. Zoe almost never swears, but she sometimes cusses when she is mad at someone. She does not have a boyfriend in the book but has to deal with Mr. H, her flirty English teacher. Zoe is afraid of being alone with Mr. H and doesn't know what to do when he asks her to go hot tubbing with him. The problem is solved when her friends go with her, though. Zoe loves to help out in churches and regularly attends. She does not have any brothers or sisters, being an only child.
- Jana Whitaker is an antagonist in the book. She is described as spoiled, bratty and mean. Often, Maddie or Angela catch Jana backstabbing her friends by spreading rumors about them. After Maddie gets drunk, Jana takes pictures of Maddie doing a table dance half naked and starts a chain letter.
- Mr. H is Zoe's English teacher and Maddie and Angela's former journalism teacher. He is a 24-year-old Christian. The girls suspect that he is sexually repressed. Mr. H was about to make a move on Zoe in a hot tub before Angela and Maddie barged in.

== Censorship ==
The Internet Girls series has regularly been included in the American Library Association's lists of the most frequently banned and challenged books in the United States. Challengers content the book due to offensive language and sexually explicit content, as well as being unsuited for the age group and going against a religious viewpoint. The series was the ninth-most censored book between 2010 and 2019. In 2009 and 2011, they topped the association's list for the top ten most censored books of the year. The book was also included in the top-ten list for 2008 (third) and 2007 (seventh).

In a survey of the 2018 "Banned Books Week", Myracle's Internet Girls series was rated No. 9 of the American Library Association "most banned books" of the first decade the 21st century.

In 2022, three of Myracle's novels (ttyl, ttfn, and Shine) were listed among 52 books banned by the Alpine School District following the implementation of Utah law H.B. 374, "Sensitive Materials In Schools," 42% of the removed books "feature LBGTQ+ characters and or themes." Many of the books were removed because they were considered to contain pornographic material according to the new law, which defines porn using the following criteria:

- "The average person" would find that the material, on the whole, "appeals to prurient interest in sex"
- The material "is patently offensive in the description or depiction of nudity, sexual conduct, sexual excitement, sadomasochistic abuse, or excretion"
- The material, on the whole, "does not have serious literary, artistic, political or scientific value."
