= Yasmeen Fletcher =

American actress

- Born: Yasmeen Tori Fletcher; March 1, 2003 (age 23); Orange County, California, U.S.
- Occupations: Actress, musician
- Years active: 2019–present

Yasmeen Tori Fletcher (/ˈjɛsmin/ YES-meen; born March 1, 2003) is an American actress and musician. She is best known for her role as Nakia Bahadir in the Disney+ series Ms. Marvel (2022).

== Early life ==
Fletcher was born in Orange County, California to parents Troy, a pool contractor and Maysoun, a defense attorney. She is of Lebanese descent on her mother's side. From the age of three, she grew up in Las Vegas, Nevada, with her younger sister. After commuting between Las Vegas and California for 12 years, the family officially relocated to La Crescenta, California, at the end of 2018.

== Career ==
Fletcher made her debut in 2019 with roles in the film Ham on Rye and as Kaitlin, Buffy's (Sofia Wylie) basketball teammate in season 3 of the Disney Channel comedy-drama Andi Mack. Fletcher then played Chandra in the Disney Channel Original Movie Upside-Down Magic, an adaptation of the Scholastic book series of the same name, and Carly in the family sci-fi Let Us In.

In December 2020, it was revealed Fletcher had joined the main cast of the 2022 Disney+ Marvel series Ms. Marvel as Nakia Bahadir, a school friend of the titular character, also known as Kamala Khan (Iman Vellani).

== Filmography ==
Key
†	Denotes films that have not yet been released

Year	Title	Role	Notes
2019	Ham on Rye	Yasmeen	
2019	Andi Mack	Kaitlin	2 episodes
2020	Upside-Down Magic	Chandra	Disney Channel Original Movie
2021	Let Us In	Carly	
2022	Ms. Marvel	Nakia Bahadir	
2023	The Graduates	Romie	
TBA	American Spirit †	Melody	
