= Diandra Lyle =

American actress

- Born: March 24, 1979 (age 47)
- Occupation: Actress
- Years active: 2010–present

Diandra Lyle is an American actress. She is best known for playing Jess Dunn in the mystery thriller series Secrets of Sulphur Springs and Erika Baker in the drama series Bel-Air.

== Early life ==
Lyle is from Des Moines, Iowa. She is a graduate of the University of Iowa. When she was laid off in 2008 from her job as recreational therapist, she had been a member of the Second City theatre troupe for over a year and decided on acting full time.

== Career ==
Early on in her career she made minor appearances in shows such as NCIS, Shameless, The Young and the Restless, Chicago Justice, Code Black, and Bones. She played Louise in a recurring role on the sitcom series American Woman. She played Jess in the Disney thriller drama series, Secrets of Sulphur Springs. She made a one-off appearance on the soap opera General Hospital and the sci-fi series Quantum Leap. She also played Erika Baker in the drama series Bel-Air.

== Filmography ==
=== Film ===
Year	Title	Role	Notes
2011	The Package	Carmen	Short
2011	Mission: Mom-Possible	Elyse	Short
2011	The Truth	Woman	Short
2011	A Blind Eye	Candi	
2012	JD Superhero	Jodi	Short
2013	And Then	Isis	Short
2013	Faux Pas	Tiffany	Short
2013	Temet Nosce	Cadence	Short
2014	Cru	Alex Pearson	
2014	Hogtown	Nia Coleman	
2015	Reggie Gaskins' Urban Love Story	Daphne Jordan	Short
2015	The Art Police	Valerie	
2015	The Summoning	Kiki	
2018	The Choir Director	Tia Gregory	
2019	Always a Bridesmaid	Nancy	
2019	Foster Boy	Officer Davies	
2019	The Teleios Act	Dr Cowl	Short
2019	Carole's Christmas	Kim	
2022	POV: Points of View	Phoenix A. I.	Short
2023	Coming Home	Sasha	Short

=== Television ===
Year	Title	Role	Notes
2018	Detroit 1-8-7	Mandy	Episode; Deja Vu/All In
2014	Real Husbands of Hollywood	Autograph Seeker #1	2 episodes
2015	Undateable	Vanessa	Episode; A Priest Walks into a Bar
2015	Murder in the First	Sharisse	Episode; My Sugar Walls
2015	The Haves and the Have Nots	Officer Hughes	Episode; Diana Winchill
2015	The Young and the Restless	Monica Albright	Episode; Episode #1.10791
2015	Me, You and Him	Jane	4 episodes
2016	Bones	Theresa Diorio	Episode; The Death in the Defense
2016	Shameless	Dr.Caughey	Episode; Requiem for a Slut
2016	Shooter	Agent Davis	Episode; Killing Zone
2017	Code Black	Donna Lowell	Episode; One in a Million
2017	Chicago Justice	Attorney Mary Graziano	Episode; Friendly Fire
2017	Rosewood	Sherriff Amy Potts	Episode; Calliphoridae & Country Roads
2017	Beauty and the Baller	Deena Castle	9 episodes
2015-2018	NCIS	Karen Stradivarius	2 episodes
2018	American Women	Louise	5 episodes
2019	Pearson	Deborah Coates	Episode; The Death in the Defense
2019	General Hospital	Wilson	Episode; 14409
2020	Moonbase 8	Alisha Patterson	Episode; Quarantine
2023	Quantum Leap	ADA Vicky Davis	Episode; Ben Song for the Defense
2021-2023	Secrets of Sulphur Springs	Jess Dunn	26 episodes
2024	9-1-1: Lone Star	Cassandra	Episode; My Way
2025	Good American Family	Deidra Hayes	2 episodes
2023-2025	Bel-Air	Erika Baker	10 episodes
2025-2026	High Potential	M.E. Regina Potter	2 episodes
