= L8r, g8r =

2007 book by Lauren Myracle

First edition (publ. Abrams Books)

l8r, g8r is the third novel in a young adult series by Lauren Myracle written entirely as instant messages; the first two are ttyl and ttfn. l8r, g8r is a coming of age novel published on March 1, 2007 by Harry N. Abrams.

l8r g8r was the No. 1 banned book in 2009 due to the prevalent sexual content, use of profanity and the use of shorthand language. The fact that the book depicts sexual content among adults also contributed to its banning. Despite the notoriety, it is widely popular among children, particularly young women who feel that they can relate to the characters.

== Plot summary ==
Angela is excited just to be reunited with her best friends Zoe and Maddie for their final year of high school. Zoe is ecstatic about seeing her boyfriend Doug after he has traveled the world. Zoe later has an encounter with a girl in her class where she shared an embarrassing secret about Jana, a viciously mean but popular school girl and an enemy of Maddie, Zoe and Angela. She find outs that Jana has a teddy bear named "Boo Boo Bear" that she is very attached to. Moments later Jana comes and finds out that Zoe knows about Boo Boo bear and becomes furious. Maddie anticipates Jana to retaliate by attacking Zoe in some way.

Zoe decides to start taking birth control pills so she can have sex with Doug. Angela gets wary of her friendship with Zoe after a classmate said that Zoe thought she was flirting with Doug. Zoe denies that she made the comment but did ask Angela if she did have feelings for him. Angela indignantly denied it. Consequently, Angela becomes a bit skeptical about her friendship with Zoe and her skepticism lingers throughout the novel.

Zoe also notably spends more time with Doug than she does with Maddie and Angela which distances her from them. As Zoe becomes more codependent on Doug, Angela becomes more aware of her lack of attraction to her boyfriend Logan. Angela later admits that she doesn't really like Logan as a boyfriend to Maddie and eventually breaks up with him.

Maddie surmises that Jana started the rumors about Angela. Therefore, Maddie decides to embarrass Jana by making an announcement essentially calling her a liar to the whole school. Jana retaliates by putting Maddie's picture of her topless on Craigslist for sexual encounters. Zoe and Angela try to help Maddie and retaliate with legal charges against Jana but Maddie refuses. Regardless of Maddie's request to leave the matter alone, Angela breaks into Jana's house and leaves a note suggesting that Jana's room has been searched.

Angela later finds out that Logan was cheating on her with Jana while they were dating. Maddie gets accepted into the University of California, Santa Cruz and Zoe gets accepted to Kenyon. Zoe is reproached by Doug for being too "codependent" and Angela for being passive after not avenging her when "Jana placed" a dead bird in her jeep.

Angela decides to move on from Logan.

Zoe decides to stop being passive and kidnap Jana's Boo Boo bear by creating a ploy to get Jana out of her car and steal the bear. Her plan nearly succeeds but she ends up being trapped in the back seat of Jana's car and witnesses Jana yelling at her step-mother who is having an affair with a liquor store clerk. Zoe is discovered by Jana and finds out that Jana didn't actually put the dead bird in Angela's car. The novel ends with the three friends recapitulating their senior year and planning to enjoy their graduation together.

== Style ==
Each page is framed to look like an IM web page with the cursor on the screen near the "send" and "cancel" button on the page. Additionally, Maddie, Zoe and Angela have their own screen name and font. Maddie is “MadMaddie” Zoe is “zoegirl” and Angela is “SnowAngel”. Emojis are also incorporated in this book.

== Theme ==
Myracle addresses the theme of friendship in the novel. She presents the necessity to defend yourself and your friends. The novel also extends the theme by suggesting that friendship should be defended wisely.

== Reception ==
Since publication in 2007, l8r, g8r has sold over 100,000 copies.

=== Censorship ===
The Internet Girls series has regularly been included in the American Library Association's lists of the most frequently banned and challenged books in the United States. Challengers content the book due to offensive language and sexually explicit content, as well as being unsuited for the age group and going against a religious viewpoint. The series was the ninth-most censored book between 2010 and 2019. In 2009 and 2011, they topped the association's list for the top ten most censored books of the year. The book was also included in the top-ten list for 2008 (third) and 2007 (seventh).

One source states that Myracle was referred to as "Satan", a "pedophile" and "corrupter of the youth" for the topics that she addresses in her novels. Another source refers to the series as "sexually explicit and offensive". Nevertheless, some kids felt that they can identify with the characters. Young girls have received her books well; one girl said that she felt that she had an older sister through Myracle's books.
