= Roommates (web series) =

American web series

Roommates was web series created by Iron Sink Media for MySpace which ran from October 2007 through May 2008. It was dubbed the "first original series" created for MySpace, and was sponsored by Fresh Look contact lenses and the Ford Motor Company, whose 2008 Ford Focus was featured prominently in the show. Roommates has been reported to have been one of the more successful web series in terms of its audience, with in excess of 25 million views.

== Plot summary ==
The show was an online dramedy centered on the lives of four main characters called the "In Town Roommates" and four secondary characters called the "Out of Towners". The primarily female cast members are recent college graduates in LA ready to begin their lives as adults. A reality show producer has made a deal with a social blogging video site to document their journey. The characters believe that they will be able to maintain their extremely codependent relationships like they had in college. The Roommates videotaped their pranks and hook-ups during their dorm years throughout their off-campus house adventures with carefree abandon. But when the pressures of professional careers and artistic aspirations mix with the voyeuristic documentary cameras; the bonds of committed friendships are severely tested. A combination of raw and voyeuristic "reality show" segments, confessionals, and college flashback footage drive the real-time story. Interactive chats and events were used to involve the audience and affect the direction of the story.
