= Vicki Lewis =

American actress and singer (born 1960)

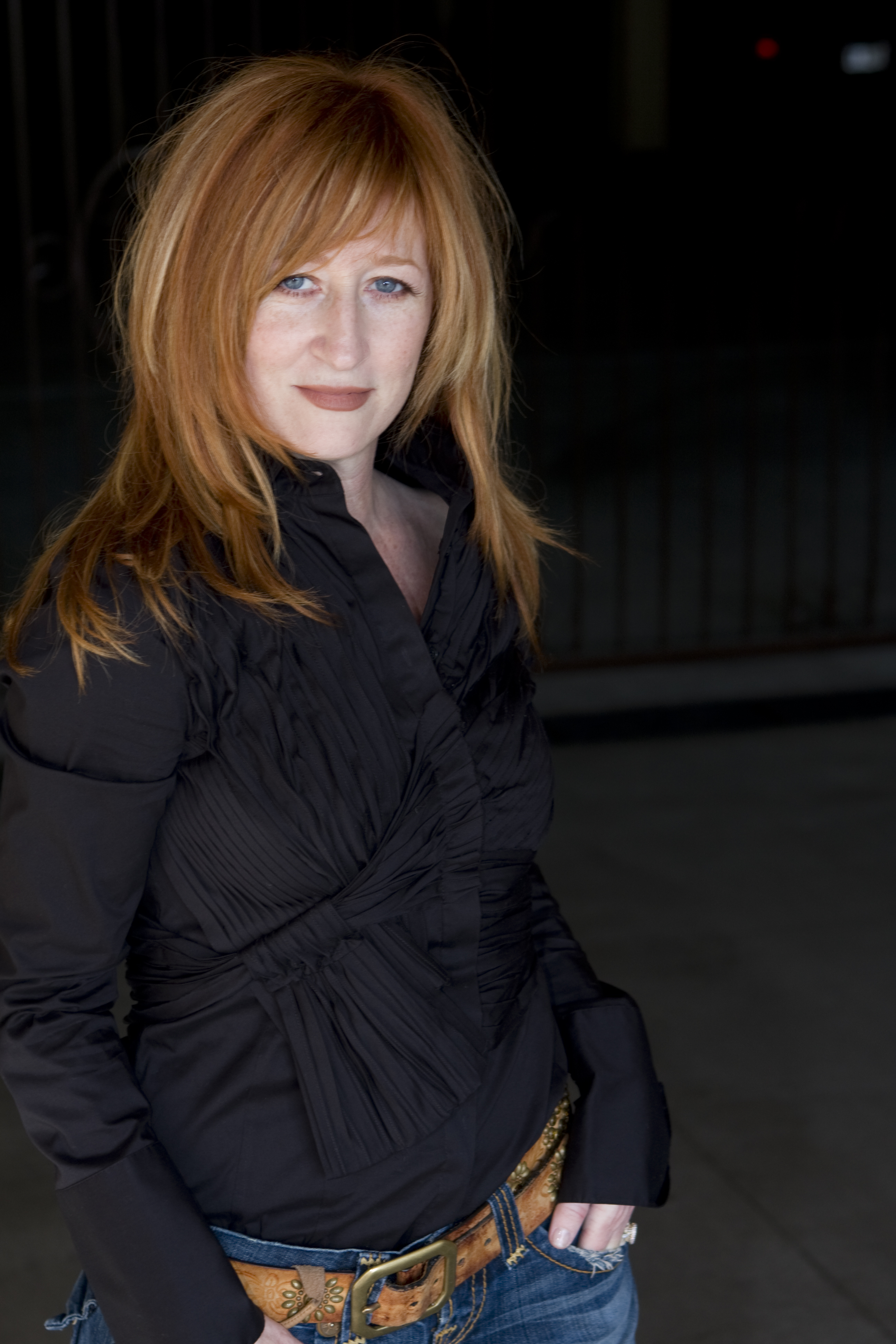
- Vicki Lewis in 2011
- Born: March 17, 1960 (age 66); Cincinnati, Ohio, U.S.
- Education: University of Cincinnati
- Occupations: Actress; singer
- Years active: 1985–present
- Spouse: Philip Allen (m. 2008)
- Partner: Nick Nolte (1994–2003)
- Website: vickilewis.com

Vicki Lewis (born March 17, 1960) is an American actress and singer. She is best known for her role as Beth in the NBC sitcom NewsRadio. She is also well known for her roles as Deb and Flo in Finding Nemo and Finding Dory, April Smuntz in Mouse Hunt, and Dr. Elsie Chapman in Godzilla. Additionally, she starred as Headmistress Knightslinger in Upside-Down Magic on Disney Channel.

== Early life and education ==
Lewis was born and raised in Cincinnati, Ohio, the daughter of Jim and Marlene Lewis. Her father was an air traffic supervisor who served in the U.S. Air Force and her mother was a nursing administrator. She also has a sister.

After graduating from Anderson High School in Cincinnati in 1978, she studied musical theater at the University of Cincinnati – College-Conservatory of Music. After receiving her diploma she moved to New York City. She proceeded to work in various on and off-Broadway shows.

== Career ==
Lewis's film appearances include roles in Finding Nemo, Finding Dory, Mouse Hunt, Godzilla, Pushing Tin, Breakfast of Champions, The Ugly Truth and I'll Do Anything.

On television, Lewis starred as Beth in the critically acclaimed series NewsRadio for five seasons on NBC from 1995-1999, followed by Three Sisters also for NBC. Her prolific television career has included roles on Curb Your Enthusiasm, Modern Family, Grey’s Anatomy, Bones, How I Met Your Mother, The Goldbergs, See Dad Run, Dirt, Seinfeld, Doll and Em, Murphy Brown, Home Improvement, Caroline in the City, The Norm Show, Grace Under Fire, Phenom, The 5 Mrs. Buchanans, Surviving Suburbia, Disney Channel's Sonny with a Chance, The Middle, Making History, Still the King, Angie Tribeca and The Blacklist.

She has voiced a myriad of characters for animated projects including Deb and Flo in Pixar's 2003 film Finding Nemo and the 2016 sequel Finding Dory. She voiced Wonder Woman in Justice League Heroes, Rugrats Pre-School Daze, King of the Hill, Hercules, An Extremely Goofy Movie, Ben 10, Phineas and Ferb, Justice League: The New Frontier, Alpha and Omega and its sequel.

Lewis had her Broadway debut in Do Black Patent Leather Shoes Really Reflect Up? (in 1982), as Velma Kelly in Chicago (in 2000 and 2001), as Gloria Thorpe in Damn Yankees (in 1994) and Mary Warren in The Crucible at The Roundabout theatre (in 1990). She also appeared off-Broadway in I Can Get It For You Wholesale (1991) and Snoopy!!! The Musical (1982). In 1995, Lewis performed as a soloist with the New York Pops at Carnegie Hall, Pal Joey for City Center Encores. Lewis won the 2007 Ovation Award for Best Featured Actress in a Musical for the world premiere of Michael John LaChiusa's Hotel C'est L'amour. In the same year, she appeared as Trina in a one-off benefit performance of the musical "Falsettos" opposite Jason Alexander and Malcolm Gets, during which her rendition of "I'm Breaking Down" received a spontaneous one-minute-long ovation mid-show.

In 2018, she starred on Broadway as Countess Lily in Anastasia, directed by Darko Tresnjak. In 2022 she performed six roles (Ms. Winx/Mrs. Brown/Kyrie/Jessamyn Jacobs/Lady in Waiting) in the original Off-Broadway production of Between the Lines for which she was nominated for the Outer Critic’s Circle Award. Most recently, in 2024, she starred as Maria Callas in Terrance McNally’s Masterclass at The Bay Street Theatre directed by Lisa Peterson.

Her debut solo album East of Midnight was released in May 2010. The eclectic rock album has songs penned by Lewis as well as three cover songs. Lewis considered the writing to be "dauntingly destructive and spiritually bereft. Locked in my office in Malibu, California I wrote what would become a self-fulfilling prophecy – it would also prove to be the making of me."

== Personal life ==
Lewis was in a long-term relationship with Nick Nolte. The two met during the filming of I'll Do Anything. She is married to sound designer Philip G. Allen.

== Filmography ==
=== Film ===
Year	Title	Role	Notes
1994	I'll Do Anything	Millie	
1997	Mouse Hunt	April Smuntz	
1998	Godzilla	Dr. Elsie Chapman	
1999	Breakfast of Champions	Grace Le Sabre	
1999	Pushing Tin	Tina Leary	
2000	An Extremely Goofy Movie	Beret Girl	Voice, direct-to-video
2003	Finding Nemo	Deb / Flo	Voice
2007	California Dreaming	Teensie Porter	
2008	Justice League: The New Frontier	Iris West	Voice, direct-to-video
2008	Roadside Romeo	Mini	Voice, uncredited
2009	Wonder Woman	Persephone	Voice, direct-to-video
2009	Dr. Dolittle: Million Dollar Mutts	Chubster	Voice, direct-to-video
2009	The Ugly Truth	Saleswoman	
2010	Alpha and Omega	Eve	Voice
2014	Tom and Jerry: The Lost Dragon	Drizelda	Voice, direct-to-video
2016	Finding Dory	Deb / Flo	Voice

=== Television ===
Year	Title	Role	Notes
1985	CBS Schoolbreak Special	Diane Kaplan	Episode: "The Day the Senior Class Got Married"
1992	Home Improvement	Maureen Binford	3 episodes
1993	Murphy Brown	Secretary No. 59	Episode: "One"
1993	Grace Under Fire	Wanda	Episode: "Say Goodnight, Gracie"
1994	Phenom	Betsy	Episode: "Angela's Fifteen Minutes"
1994	Seinfeld	Ada	2 episodes
1995	The 5 Mrs. Buchanans	Donna	Episode: "Viv'acious"
1995	Bye Bye Birdie	Gloria Rasputin	Television film
1995–1999	NewsRadio	Beth	94 episodes
1996	Caroline in the City	Merle Heller	Episode: "Caroline in the Cereal"
1997–2005	Rugrats	Miss Carol, Miss Weemer, Witch, Mother Cat	Voice, 6 episodes
1998	Hercules	Arachne	Voice, episode: "Hercules and the Tapestry of Fate"
1999	The Wild Thornberrys	Weasel	Voice, episode: "Lost and Foundation"
1999	The Norm Show	Kyra	Episode: "Drive, Norm Say"
2000	King of the Hill	Kate	Voice, episode: "Movin' on Up"
2000	The Huntress	Myrna Factor	Episode: "Pilot"
1999–2000, 2002	Mission Hill	Posey Tyler, Natalie Leibowitz-Hernandez	Voice, 13 episodes
2001–2002	Three Sisters	Nora Bernstein-Flynn	18 episodes
2005	Rugrats Pre-School Daze	Ms. Weemer	Voice, 4 episodes
2007–2008, 2010	Betsy's Kindergarten Adventures	Molly	Voice, 17 episodes
2007	Come On Over	Actress Vicki	Episode: "Thespians"
2007	Grey's Anatomy	Harriet	Episode: "Physical Attraction... Chemical Reaction"
2007	The Last Day of Summer	Paige	Television film
2008	Dirt	The Beautician	Episode: "What Is This Thing Called?"
2008	Phineas and Ferb	Lulu Jones	Voice, episode: "Leave the Busting to Us!"
2008	Ben 10: Alien Force	Serena	Voice, episode: "X = Ben + 2"
2008	'Til Death	Melissa	3 episodes
2009	Bones	Helen Bridenbecker	Episode: "The Skull in the Sculpture"
2009–2010	Sonny with a Chance	Ms. Joy Bitterman	5 episodes
2009	Surviving Suburbia	Clerk	2 episodes
2009	Curb Your Enthusiasm	Stacey	Episode: "The Table Read"
2009	The Middle	Ms. Barry	Episode: "The Scratch"
2010	Den Brother	Dina Reams	Television film
2011	Melissa & Joey	Alexis McKenna	Episode: "The Settlement"
2011	Batman: The Brave and the Bold	Wonder Woman, Star Sapphire	Voice, 2 episodes
2011–2012	How I Met Your Mother	Dr. Sonya	3 episodes
2011	Ben 10: Ultimate Alien	Agent Locke	Voice, episode: "The Widening Gyre"
2012	Checked Out	Lisa	3 episodes
2012	I Married Who?	Vivienne	Television film
2013	Doll & Em	Carla	2 episodes
2013	Austin & Ally	Donna	Episode: "Family & Feuds"
2014	Turbo Fast	Arctic Hare, Rich Lady #1	Voice, episode: "The Escargot Affair"
2014	See Dad Run	Kat	2 episodes
2014	Complete Works	Ashley Spitzer	2 episodes
2014–2020	Doc McStuffins	Dr. Tundra	Voice, 4 episodes
2015	Modern Family	Erica	2 episodes
2016	Angie Tribeca	Anne Muffet	Episode: "Fleas Don't Kill Me"
2017	Making History	Mrs. Chadwick	Episode: "Chadwick's Angels"
2017	Still the King	Dr. Chapman	Episode: "Battle of the Basement"
2019	The Blacklist	Marie Mortel	Episode: "The Third Estate"
2020	Upside-Down Magic	Headmistress Knightslinger	Disney Channel Original Movie
2021	The Goldbergs	Maggie	Episode: "The Goldbergs' Excellent Adventure"

=== Video games ===
Year	Title	Voice role
2003	Finding Nemo	Deb / Flo
2009	Ben 10 Alien Force: Vilgax Attacks	Serena
