= Ttfn (novel) =

2005 book by Lauren Myracle

ttfn
- First edition cover
- Author: Lauren Myracle
- Genre: Young adult fiction
- Publisher: Amulet/Abrams
- Publication date: March 1, 2006
- Pages: 224
- ISBN: 0-8109-5971-2
- Preceded by: ttyl
- Followed by: l8r, g8r

ttfn is a young adult novel by American author Lauren Myracle. Published by Harry N. Abrams, Inc. in 2005, it is the sequel to ttyl (2004), and is also written entirely in the style of instant messaging conversation. It is followed by l8r, g8r (2007).

The book reached number 4 on the New York Times Best Seller list for children's chapter books in March 2006.

This novel follows Maddie ("MadMaddie"), Zoe ("ZoeGirl"), and Angela ("SnowAngel") through the ups and downs of their junior year.

== Plot ==
Best friends Angela, Maddie, and Zoe are now juniors. Zoe begins to volunteer at Kidding Around, a childcare facility, and finds out that Doug, who used to have a crush on Angela, works there too. Maddie hooks up with a guy named Clive (nicknamed Chive, by Maddie) at her cousin's wedding. During a party hosted by a classmate, Zoe flirts with Doug (much to Angela's dismay), and Maddie once again hooks up with Clive, although persistent they are nothing more than friends. Angela shares her worries about her parents unusual behavior to her friends, and the two have reason to believe Angela's father is having an affair after Zoe's awkward confrontation with him with another woman at Starbucks. Angela's parents eventually reveal that they are moving to California, due to Mr. Silver's loss of his job. While Angela's house is under contract, Zoe expresses her feelings for Doug to Maddie, which conflicts with Angela's request for Zoe to not go out with Doug. Meanwhile, Maddie smokes pot for the first time with Clive and his friends.

== Characters ==
- Angela Silver or SnowAngel is one of the main protagonists and is best friends with Zoe Barrett and Madigan Kinnick. She has to move to California because of a job issue involving her father. At first, Angela asked Zoe to stay away from Doug, but later, she turns out to be very supportive. Angela has a twelve-year-old sister, Chrissy, whom she finds really annoying.
- Madigan "Maddie" Kinnick or mad maddie is one of the main protagonists and is best friends with Angela Silver and Zoe Barrett. She has feelings for Clive (or Chive), although she constantly denies it. Maddie also tried out pot for the first time with him. She has an eighteen-year-old brother named Mark.
- Zoe Barrett or zoegirl is one of the main protagonists and is best friends with Angela Silver and Madigan Kinnick. She is described as smart and kind. Zoe volunteers for a childcare place called Kidding Around, where Doug, who used to crush on Angela, volunteers also. She has feelings for Doug, which Angela was against at first. She does not have any brothers or sisters, being an only child.
- Clive or Chive is one of Maddie's crushes, although she denies it. They first met and made out at Maddie's cousin's wedding, and they have made out many times throughout the book. Angela worries that Clive does not care enough about Maddie, considering the fact that he also has feelings for another girl named Whitney.
- Doug is one of the secondary characters. He used to have a severe crush on Angela, but is now Zoe's boyfriend. He is described as sweet and poetry-obsessed.
- Glendy is one of the secondary characters. She is Angela's Dad's Boss' daughter, she is the only person that hangs out with Angela when she moves to California. She is described as clingy, childish and is not liked by any of the other characters.

== Censorship ==
The Internet Girls series has regularly been included in the American Library Association's lists of the most frequently banned and challenged books in the United States. Challengers content the book due to offensive language and sexually explicit content, as well as being unsuited for the age group and going against a religious viewpoint. The series was the ninth-most censored book between 2010 and 2019. In 2009 and 2011, they topped the association's list for the top ten most censored books of the year. The book was also included in the top-ten list for 2008 (third) and 2007 (seventh).

In 2022, three of Myracle's novels (ttyl, ttfn, and Shine) were listed among 52 books banned by the Alpine School District following the implementation of Utah law H.B. 374, “Sensitive Materials In Schools," 42 removed books “feature LBGTQ+ characters and or themes.” Many of the books were removed because they were considered to contain pornographic material according to the new law, which defines porn using the following criteria:

- "The average person" would find that the material, on the whole, "appeals to prurient interest in sex"
- The material "is patently offensive in the description or depiction of nudity, sexual conduct, sexual excitement, sadomasochistic abuse, or excretion"
- The material, on the whole, "does not have serious literary, artistic, political or scientific value."
