= Sarah Mlynowski =

Canadian and American writer

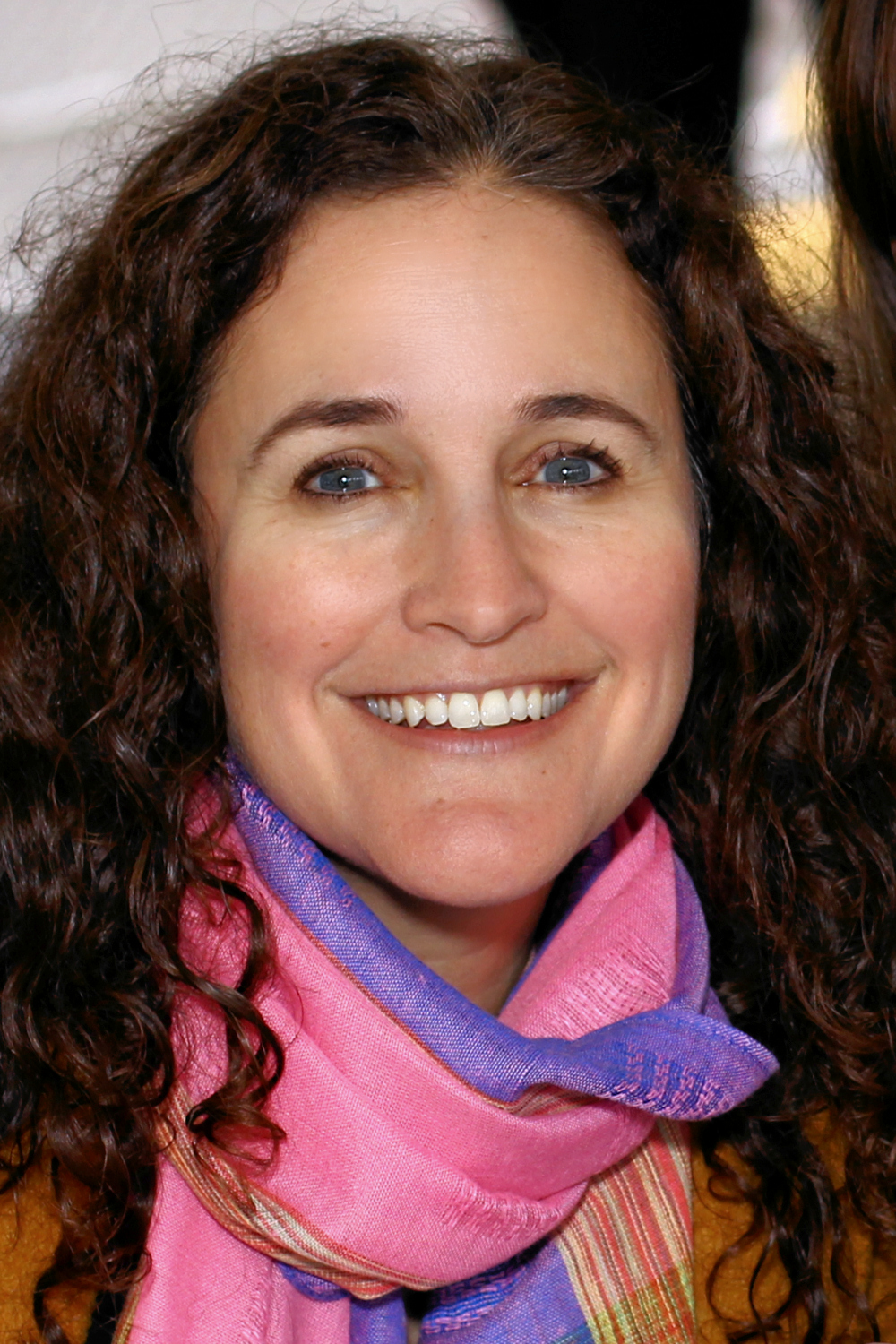
- Mlynowski at the 2023 Texas Book Festival
- Born: January 4, 1977 (age 49); Montreal, Quebec, Canada
- Citizenship: United States, Canada
- Occupation: Novelist
- Spouse: Todd Swidler
- Children: Chloe and Anabelle
- Relatives: Elissa Ambrose (mother) and Larry Mlynowski (father)
- Writing career
- Period: 2001–present
- Website: www.sarahm.com

Sarah Mlynowski (born January 4, 1977) is a Canadian and American writer of middle-grade fiction, young adult novels, and adult fiction. She lives in Los Angeles.

== Biography ==
Sarah Mlynowski is the daughter of the romance writer Elissa Ambrose. Her parents are divorced, and she has one sister, Aviva Mlynowski, and an older stepsister. She graduated with an Honors degree in English literature from McGill University. Later, she moved to Toronto to work for Harlequin Enterprises Ltd. She used her romance publishing experiences in her first novel Milkrun, which has since been published in 16 countries, selling over 600,000 copies around the globe. After her second novel Fishbowl was published, she moved to New York City to write full-time. She is best known for her New York Times best-selling series Whatever After. Along with authors Michael Buckley, Julia DeVillers, and Adele Griffin, Mlynowski is a co-founder of OMG BookFest, a book festival geared to middle-grade readers.

Mlynowski married her husband Todd in 2004, and together they have two daughters, Chloe and Anabelle.

In March 2026, Mlynowski and her husband legally became American citizens after twenty-five years of living in the United States.

== Bibliography ==
=== Adult fiction ===
- Milkrun (2001)
- Fishbowl (2002)
- As Seen on TV (2003)
- Monkey Business (2004)
- Me Vs. Me (2006)

=== Non-fiction ===
- See Jane Write (2006) (with Farrin Jacobs)

=== Young adult ===
- Magic in Manhattan series
  1. Bras & Broomsticks (2005)
  2. Frogs & French Kisses (2006)
  3. Spells & Sleeping Bags (2007)
  4. Parties & Potions (2008)
- How to Be Bad (2008) (with E. Lockhart and Lauren Myracle)
- Gimme a Call (2010)
- Ten Things We Did (and Probably Shouldn't Have) (2011)
- Don't Even Think About It (2014)
- Think Twice (Don't Even Think About It, Book #2) (2016)
- I See London, I See France (2017)

=== Middle grade ===
- Whatever After series
  1. Fairest of All (2012)
  2. If the Shoe Fits (2012)
  3. Sink or Swim (2013)
  4. Dream On (2013)
  5. Bad Hair Day (2014)
  6. Cold As Ice (2014)
  7. Beauty Queen (2015)
  8. Once Upon a Frog (2015)
  9. Genie in a Bottle (2016)
  10. Sugar and Spice (2016)
  11. Abby in Wonderland (2017)
  12. Two Peas in a Pod (2018)
  13. Seeing Red (2018)
  14. Spill the Beans (2019)
  15. Abby in Oz (2020)
  16. Good As Gold (2021)
  17. Just Dance (2022)
  18. Abby in Neverland (2023)
  19. Whatever After the Graphic Novel: Fairest of All (2024)
  20. Liar Liar (2024)
  21. Mirror Mirror (2025)
  22. Whatever After the Graphic Novel: If the Shoe Fits (2025)
- Upside-Down Magic series (with Emily Jenkins and Lauren Myracle)
  1. Upside-Down Magic (2015)
  2. Upside-Down Magic: Sticks & Stones (2016)
  3. Upside-Down Magic: Showing Off (2017)
  4. Upside-Down Magic: Dragon Overnight (2018)
  5. Upside-Down Magic: Weather of Not (2019)
  6. Upside-Down Magic: The Big Shrink (2019)
  7. Upside-Down Magic: Hide and Seek (2020)
  8. Upside-Down Magic: Night Owl (2021)
- The Legends of Greemulax (2019) (with Kimmy Schmidt)
- Best Wishes series
  1. Best Wishes (2022)
  2. Sister Switch (2023) (with Debbie Rigaud)
  3. Time After Time (2023) (with Christina Soontornvat)
  4. Like A Boss (2024)

=== Picture Books ===
- A Dragon for Hanukkah (2024)
