= Lauren Myracle =

American young adult novelist (born 1969)

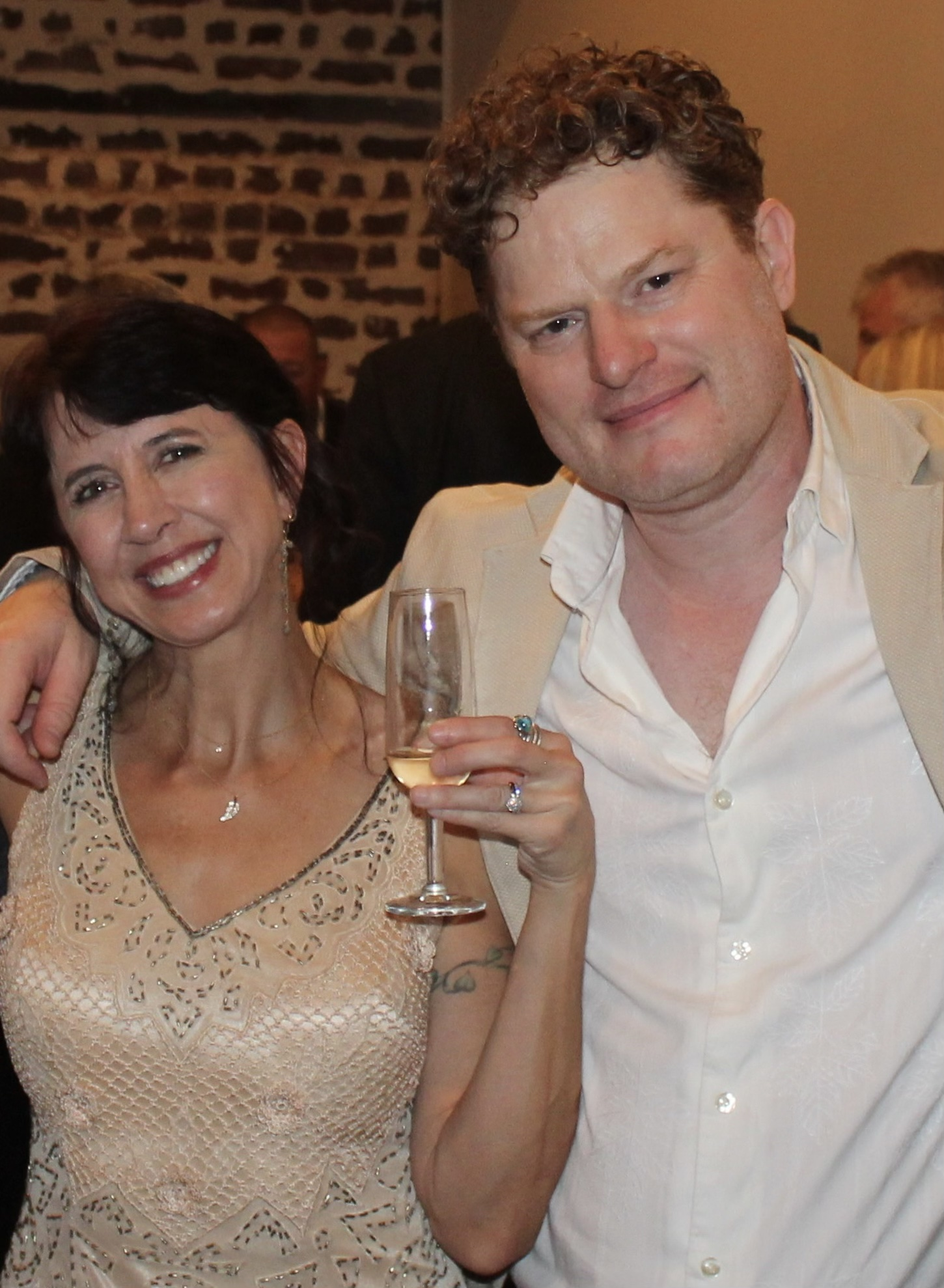
- Myracle with husband Randy Bartels in 2022
- Born: May 15, 1969 (age 57); Brevard, North Carolina, U.S.
- Education: University of North Carolina at Chapel Hill (BA); Colorado State University (MA); Vermont College of Fine Arts (MFA)
- Occupation: Novelist
- Spouse: Randy Bartels
- Writing career
- Genre: Young adult fiction
- Website: Official website

Lauren Myracle (born May 15, 1969) is an American writer of young adult fiction. She has written many novels, including the three best-selling "IM" books, ttyl, ttfn and l8r, g8r. Her book Thirteen Plus One was released May 4, 2011.

== Early life ==
Myracle was born in Brevard, North Carolina, and is the oldest of three sisters; she has three older brothers. She grew up in Atlanta, Georgia, where she attended Trinity School and The Westminster Schools. Myracle earned a BA in English and Psychology from University of North Carolina at Chapel Hill where she was inducted into Phi Beta Kappa.

After graduation, Myracle worked for some time as a middle-school teacher in Gwinnett County, Georgia, and participated in the JET Programme in Japan. Myracle later earned an MA in English from Colorado State University, where she taught for two years and an MFA in Writing for Children and Young Adults from Vermont College.

== Career ==
Myracle's first novel, Kissing Kate, was released in 2003. Her middle-grade novel, Eleven, came out 2004, and Twelve came out in 2007. Myracle published The Fashion Disaster that Changed My Life in 2005. Thirteen was released in March 2008. She came out with the book Thirteen Plus One in 2010. She also wrote Rhymes with Witches and Bliss, which came out in 2008, is its prequel. She also has a book entitled How to Be Bad with E. Lockhart and Sarah Mlynowski.

The Internet Girls series comprises ttyl (talk to you later), ttfn (ta ta for now), and l8r, g8r (later, gator). It features three friends—Zoe, Maddie, and Angela—who experience typical high school drama: boys, drugs, alcohol, parties, driving, and college prep. The novels ttyl and ttfn were both New York Times bestsellers, and ttyl was the first novel to be written entirely in instant messages. Most of Myracle's novels take place in Atlanta, Georgia and are inspired by her childhood friends and experiences, and her large diverse family.

In November, 2011, she published Shine, which is set in rural western North Carolina and deals with a young girl's search for the perpetrators of a hate crime against her gay friend.

Her latest work, released in August, 2013, is entitled The Infinite Moment of Us. According to Publishers Weekly, the coming of age story "is a rewarding account of two young people whose insecurities and personal histories weigh on the romance they work to build with each other."

== Censorship ==
Myracle's books, especially the Internet Girls series, have regularly been included in the American Library Association's lists of the most frequently banned and challenged books in the United States. Challengers contend the book due to offensive language and sexually explicit content, as well as being unsuited for the age group and going against a religious viewpoint. The series was the ninth-most censored book between 2010 and 2019. In 2009 and 2011, they topped the association's list for the top ten most censored books of the year. The book was also included in the top-ten list for 2008 (third) and 2007 (seventh).

Scholastic Books nearly refused to carry Luv Ya Bunches at its national school book fair events because the book features lesbian mothers. Scholastic recanted its initial decision after a large internet outcry.

In 2022, three of Myracle's novels (ttyl, ttfn, and Shine) were listed among 52 books banned by the Alpine School District following the implementation of Utah law H.B. 374, “Sensitive Materials In Schools," 42 removed books “feature LBGTQ+ characters and or themes.” Many of the books were removed because they were considered to contain pornographic material according to the new law, which defines porn using the following criteria:

- "The average person" would find that the material, on the whole, "appeals to prurient interest in sex"
- The material "is patently offensive in the description or depiction of nudity, sexual conduct, sexual excitement, sadomasochistic abuse, or excretion"
- The material, on the whole, "does not have serious literary, artistic, political or scientific value."

Myracle has spoken at length about the angry responses she has received from those upset with her work such as one parent who stated that she could not “believe [that Myracle] introduced [her] 13-year-old daughter to thong underwear.” Another opponent was appalled at a hot tub scene in ttyl while a separate writer stated that the author did not have the right to “influence young girls to follow in [her] horrible footsteps.” Overall, the author herself has noted that opponents tend to consistently get upset over three subjects often found in her books: thongs, tampons and erections.

Myracle is highly critical of adults attempting to keep books away from teenagers, believing that kids are smart enough to understand the message in books and learn their lessons. Regarding her own children's reading, she says "As a mom, I want my kids to read any book they want! I want them to read."

== Awards and honors ==
Her first novel, Kissing Kate, was selected an Allie McNamara ALA Best Books for Young Adults for the year 2004. Booklist selected it as one of the "Top Ten Youth Romances" of the year, as well as one of the "Top Ten Books by New Writers".

Rhymes with Witches is included in Anita Silvey's 500 Great Books for Teens and was nominated for "Best Books for Young Adults" by the American Library Association.

=== National Book Foundation controversy ===
In October, 2011, a controversy occurred when the National Book Foundation listed Shine as one of the five finalists for its annual National Book Award for Young People's Literature. Then it announced a mistake: Chime was the intended finalist; it would make an exception and consider six finalists. Shortly thereafter, NBF asked her to withdraw Shine from consideration and Myracle agreed to do so.

== Published works ==
=== Series ===
==== The Winnie Years (2004–2010) ====
- Ten (2010)
- Eleven (2004)
- Twelve (2007)
- Thirteen (2008)
- Thirteen Plus One (2009)

==== Internet Girls (2005–2014) ====
- ttyl (2005)
- ttfn (2007)
- l8r, g8r (2008)
- bff (2009)
- yolo (2014)

==== Flower Power (2009–2013) ====
- Luv Ya Bunches (2009)
- Violet in Bloom (2010)
- Oopsy Daisy (2011)
- Awesome Blossom (2013)

==== The Life of Ty (2013–2015) ====
- Penguin Problems (2013)
- Non-Random Acts of Kindness (2014)
- Friends of a Feather (2015)

==== Upside-Down Magic (2015–2019) ====
This series was co-written with Sarah Mlynowski and E. Lockhart.

- Upside Down Magic (2015)
- Sticks & Stones (2016)
- Showing Off (2016)
- Dragon Overnight (2018)
- Weather or Not (2018)
- The Big Shrink (2019)

==== Wishing Day (2016–2018) ====
- Wishing Day (2016)
- The Forgetting Spell (2017)
- The Backward Season (2018)

=== Stand-alone novels, short stories, and comics ===
- Kissing Kate (2003)
- The Fashion Disaster That Changed My Life (2005)
- “Such a Pretty Face,” published in the short story anthology Four Summer Stories: Fireworks (2007)
- Prom Nights from Hell, co-written by Lauren Myracle, Meg Cabot, Kim Harrison, Michele Jaffe, and Stephenie Meyer (2007)
- How to Be Bad, cowritten by Lauren Myracle, Sarah Mlynowski, and E. Lockhart (2008)
- Bliss (2008)
- Let It Snow, cowritten by Lauren Myracle, Maureen Johnson, and John Green (2008)
- Peace, Love, and Baby Ducks (2009)
- Shine (2009)
- The Infinite Moment of Us (2013)
- Under the Moon: A Catwoman Tale, a graphic novel in the DC Ink line, based on Catwoman/Selina Kyle (2019). This book was a 2019 Goodreads Choice Award Nominee for Graphic Novels and Comics.
- Victor and Nora A Gotham Love Story, a graphic novel in the DC Ink line, based on Mr. Freeze and his wife, Nora Kumar (2020)
