= Um =

Um or UM may refer to:

== Businesses and organisations ==
- Air Zimbabwe (IATA:UM)
- Union for the Mediterranean, an intergovernmental body
- United Methodist Church
- United Motors Company, an American automotive parts supplier
- Universal McCann, a global advertising and media agency
- Universal Medicine, an Australian cult

== Language ==
- "Um", a filler in spoken English and some other languages
- Um (cuneiform), an ancient alphabetic symbol

== Science and technology ==
- Micrometre (μm), sometimes written as "um" in limited character sets
- Ultrarapid metabolizer, a term used in pharmacogenomics to refer to individuals with substantially increased metabolic activity
- .um, the Internet domain for the US Minor Outlying Islands
- Um interface, the air interface for the GSM mobile telephone standard
- Unified Model, a global numerical weather prediction model
- User manual, a document or manual intended to give assistance to people using a particular system
- Utilization management, the evaluation of the appropriateness, medical need and efficiency of health care

== Other uses ==
- Um (Korean surname)
- Umphrey's McGee, a jam band, stylized as UM
- Unified Messaging, in marketing
- United States Minor Outlying Islands (ISO 3166:UM)
- Unofficial magistrate, as a postnominal
- Uttaradi Math, a Hindu matha (monastery)
