= Turtles All the Way Down (soundtrack) =

Turtles All the Way Down (Original Motion Picture Soundtrack)

Film score by Ian Hultquist
- Released: May 3, 2024
- Recorded: 2022
- Studio: Evergreen Stage
- Genre: Film score
- Length: 38:34
- Label: WaterTower Music
- Producer: Catherine Joy

Ian Hultquist chronology
| The Faceless Lady (2024) | Turtles All the Way Down (2024) | All of You (2024) |

Turtles All the Way Down (Original Motion Picture Soundtrack) is the film score to the 2024 film Turtles All the Way Down directed by Hannah Marks. Based on John Green's 2017 novel of the same name, the film stars Isabela Merced, Cree, Felix Mallard, Maliq Johnson, Poorna Jagannathan, Judy Reyes and J. Smith-Cameron. The film score is composed by Ian Hultquist and released through WaterTower Music on May 3, 2024.

== Development ==
The film score is composed by Ian Hultquist. He began recording the score by December 2022 and completed within the same month. Ian considered the film to be really proud of as he liked John Green's novel, and the film being "gorgeous and sweet". Owing to tap into the emotional undertones, he borrowed some elements of the music which based on his personal life as well. The score utilizes strings, synths and guitars resulting in an indie pop quality. The final composition "Love is How You Become Real" was based on his own demo verbatim which Marks liked it eventually being used in the film.

Season Kent served as the music supervisor, having worked on all of Green's film adaptations. Marks focused on utilizing upbeat pop numbers, to maintain the youthful rhythm and personally wrote fan letters to artists so that she could secure the licensing rights of those songs.

== Release ==
The soundtrack was released through WaterTower Music on May 3, 2024.

== Reception ==
Lovia Gyarkye of The Hollywood Reporter wrote "Ian Hultquist's often brooding score feels most at home". Kate Bove of Screen Rant said that Hultquist's score ranges from "heartfelt to anxiety-inducing". Kate Erbland of IndieWire called it a "peppy" soundtrack.

== Track listing ==
| No. | Title | Length |
|---|---|---|
| 1. | "Maybe Sunday" | 0:35 |
| 2. | "Peanut Butter & Honey" | 1:51 |
| 3. | "Russell Pickett Disappeared" | 0:57 |
| 4. | "Still Floats" | 1:54 |
| 5. | "Micro Bianca" | 0:33 |
| 6. | "It Hums" | 3:47 |
| 7. | "Tau Ceti" | 1:02 |
| 8. | "You Can Look Now" | 1:30 |
| 9. | "Professor Abbott" | 2:01 |
| 10. | "Maybe You're Infinite" | 1:47 |
| 11. | "Kill Every Last Germ" | 1:19 |
| 12. | "Ayala" | 1:51 |
| 13. | "Ignoring Davis" | 1:00 |
| 14. | "Nothing but Mustard" | 2:08 |
| 15. | "You Are the Demon" | 3:05 |
| 16. | "We're Here Because" | 1:25 |
| 17. | "The Mirror Thing" | 1:37 |
| 18. | "You Need to Be Here" | 1:37 |
| 19. | "The Worst Kind of Note" | 2:55 |
| 20. | "Two Months Later" | 0:52 |
| 21. | "All You Can Be in Is Love" | 1:55 |
| 22. | "Love Is How You Become Real" | 2:53 |
| Total length: | | 38:34 |

== Additional music ==
The following songs are featured in the film, but not included in the soundtrack:

- "Oh No" – Biig Piig
- "Bad Guy" – Billie Eilish
- "Ms. Jackson" – Outkast
- "Dance Yrself Clean" – LCD Soundsystem
- "The Less I Know the Better" – Tame Impala
- "Golden Light" – STRFKR
- "Awe (Part II)" – Jayeson Andel
- "Sunflower, Vol. 6" – Harry Styles
- "The Loop" – Toro y Moi
- "Zeitgeist" – Babe Rainbow

== Personnel ==
Credits adapted from Film Music Reporter:

- Music composer: Ian Hultquist
- Music producer: Catherine Joy
- Music supervisor: Season Kent
- Music editor: Ben Zales
- Orchestrators: Catherine Joy, Joseph Carrillo, Edith Mudge, H.B. Thal, Ray D. Kim
- Recording and mixing: Brian Taylor at the Evergreen Stage
- Protools operator: Jeff Fitzpatrick
- Technical score engineer and programmer: Robinton Hobbs
- Music preparation: Joy Music House, Composer Press
- Score coordinators: Edith Mudge, Lisa Liu, Norvin Tu-Wang
- Scoring consultant: Celeste Chada
- Music clearance: Jessica Dolinger
- Music coordinator: Chelsea Boggess

Featured musicians

- Bass: Karl Vincent
- Cello: Julie Jung, Ben Lash, Ro Rowan, Mikala Schmitz
- Double bass: Stephanie Payne
- Drums: Hal Rosenfeld
- Viola: Marta Honer, Hanbyul Jang, Linnea Powell, Nadia Sirota, Colleen Sugata
- Violin: Niv Ashkenazi, Andrew Bulbrook, Delaney Harter, Yvette Holzwarth, Marta Honer, Rachel Iba, Hanbyul Jang, Juliette Jones, Patti Kilroy, Ana Landauer, Lorand Lokuszta, Grace Oh, Joel Pargman, Jayla Tang
