= List of Necessary Roughness characters =

This is a list of characters in the USA Network original drama TV series, Necessary Roughness. The principal cast of the series has remained mostly the same throughout the series. However, various recurring characters have appeared over the course of the show's run.

== Main characters ==
=== Dr. Danielle "Dani" Santino ===
Dr. Danielle "Dani" Santino (née Romano) (Callie Thorne) is the protagonist. Dr. Dani Santino is a tough divorcée who, to make ends meet, becomes the therapist for a professional football team and quickly becomes sought after by other athletes, musicians, politicians and those living in the spotlight. Dani has a relationship with the team's athletic trainer, Matt Donnally, but tries to keep it secret from both the team and her children. Throughout the series one of her main patients is Terrence King. He falls into trouble because of his antics, no matter how much Dr. Dani advises him against them. She tries to help him deal with getting shot in the second season, but T.K. goes into a downward spiral and she advises the team to do an intervention for T.K.; he ends going into rehab. Dr. Santino falls in and out of her relationship with Matt, because he wants to have children and she doesn't want to have anymore. Dr. Dani kisses Nico Careles after Marshall Pittman dies in a plane crash. After the new Hawks' ownership brings in a new GM/head coach, Dani has a personality clash with the new head coach and is fired as the team's psychologist. Then she gets a mysterious call to take a limo, which takes her to the V3 office. Connor McClane asked for her help with a client, and was impressed with Dani's work. So, she gets wooed over by McClane and gets an offer with V3 that she can't refuse provided on the condition that she closes her private practice.

=== Dominic Eugene "Nico" Careles ===
Nico Careles (Scott Cohen) is a former Navy SEAL from Pittsburgh, employed as the team's head of security and "fixer", he works closely with Dani. In season one and early season two, Nico tries to keep Marshall Pittman's daughter (Danielle Panabaker) out of trouble with boys and drugs. He tells her that he can't do it anymore. Pittman uses Nico to spy on the team to bug the team and Dr. Dani, but instead Nico bugs Pittman and learns that Pittman has serious problems, forcing Pittman to seek treatment in the midst of his divorce from his wife. Nico breaks into T.K.'s home, discovering that T.K. has a serious addiction to pain medication, swiping all of T.K.'s medication, including a "flush" (which pushes medications out of the system, hiding his drug use in a drug test). Eventually it is leaked that Terrence had a drug problem. Nico does what he can to find the source of the leak. Nico later learns that a friend (Mike Pniewski) of his has double crossed him and bugged the team for Marshall Pittman. After Pittman's plane crashed he tries to search for evidence that suggested Pittman was alive, telling Dr. Santino that Pittman saved his life once, after Nico was in love with his ex, Gabrielle. In "All the Kings Horses", he and Dani share a kiss after it is confirmed that Pittman had died in the plane crash. After Juliette Pittman inherits the team, Nico eventually becomes the key person that creates pressure for Juliette (Pittman) to sell the team. Furthermore, he uncovers Juliette's unethical behavior (as an owner) and gives her an ultimatum to sell the team in order for the team to avoid a scandal. However, he also finds out some roadblocks that are preventing the sale of the Hawks, because Marshall Pittman made some questionable deals before his tragic plane crash. He was offered a position in Dallas by Mark Cuban, but nothing panned out. Before he left the Hawks, Nico was questioned by federal agents. It's also believed that Nico had a mysterious role in bringing Dani to her new job at V3. However, the details of his involvement on how exactly he got Dani to V3 remains to be seen.

=== Terrence "T.K." King ===
Terrence "T.K." King (Mehcad Brooks) is the New York Hawks' star player and Dani's main focus when she was hired by the football team. Terrence often finds himself doing childish things, mainly spending his money on himself and various women, getting himself into trouble with a rival psychiatrist of Dr. Dani, Laz Rollins (Orlando Jones) who used T.K. for his money, and wasn't helping him with his problems. At the end of the first season, King was shot after celebrating a season win. He is seen trying to deal with it in his own way in the second season opener, T.K. even resorts to buying his own gun, almost pulling it out on stage during a party to open the new football season. Matt calls a Chinese physical therapist to help T.K. deal with the pain. At first, T.K. doesn't wanting her to touch him where he had been shot. After Dr. Dani tells him that he needs to acknowledge he'd been shot, T.K. lets her. T.K. testified against his shooter in his own comical way in the episode "Spell It Out", but after the trial concludes T.K. begins taking prescription pain medications and becomes addicted to them. This causes T.K. to become irritable and reckless, flashing reporter Noelle Saris (Michaela McManus) in the Hawk's locker room. When approached about it by the team, he denies it, yet surveillance video showed otherwise. T.K. who initially hazed Damon Razor (Gaius Charles), helps him with his problems and to see his true potential as a football player with the Hawks, and what was important to him, causing T.K. to see one of his own problems with addiction. T.K. becomes enraged on the set of a sports drink commercial photo shoot and is fired by the director. T.K. then fires his own agent (who wasn't looking out for his best interests) and storms off. He gets behind the wheel of a car, tries to take some of his medication – which he paid a doctor under the table to get – and wrecks his car, almost running over a little girl. Dr. Dani and the team stage an intervention for T.K., getting him off of the field and placing him in rehab. T.K. tries his best to break out, seeking help from an old friend in rehab (Michael Imperioli). After a night of heavy partying and drinking, his friend died in their hotel room. T.K. agreed to return to rehab after this occurred. T.K. is based partly on NFL receiver Terrell Owens, who went by the nickname T.O., and has often been criticized and complimented for his brashness on and off the field. King, like Owens, is an extremely talented, often publicly maligned wide receiver. Owens himself plays a guest character in the series named Maurice "The Minefield" Manningfield, a defensive rival of King. T.K. has a hard time recovering over his shooting tragedy and struggles to regain his ability. He eventually finds a mentor to help him reinvent himself. He helps his teammate Rex come out of the closet. T.K. was temporarily devastated that Dani has moved onto V3. T.K. initially hates the new coach, but realizes his best chance to win a championship lies with him and eventually opens up to the new coach and accepts his ways. Dani has convinced him that he grown so much that he no longer needs her guidance.

=== Paloma Madsen ===
Paloma Madsen (Karissa Lee Staples) is Dani's ambitious new assistant.

=== Connor McClane ===
Connor McClane (John Stamos) is the founder of a sports and entertainment management empire named V3, who expresses interest in hiring Dani. Dani accepts his offer.

== Former main characters ==
=== Matthew "Matt" Donnally ===
Matthew "Matt" Donnally (Marc Blucas; Seasons 1–2) is the New York Hawks' athletic trainer, and later general manager, to whom Dani was attracted. Matt has begun a relationship with Dani, who wants to keep it secret. In the middle of season two, Matt tells Dani that he wants to have children of his own with Dani, but she doesn't want to have any more children, which leaves their relationship at a standstill. Matt also tries to look out for T.K.'s best interests, even though T.K. does the opposite. Donnally also recruits two new football players to the team; one named Damon Razor (Gaius Charles) who has a shady past, and another whose agent (Rob Estes) was T.K.'s former agent. He eventually becomes the GM when Marshall Pittmans' daughter inherits the team. After Juliette Pittman sells the Hawks to the new ownership, they reassigned Donnally and they hired a new GM who is abrasive, but has an impressive track record of winning 4 championships. Donnally later quits the Hawks and becomes the GM for Boston and also becomes an expecting father with reporter Noelle Saris.

=== Lindsay Santino ===
Lindsay Santino (Hannah Marks; Seasons 1–2, guest season 3) is Dani's rebellious teenage daughter. In season two, Lindsay sees a therapist (Amy Sedaris) about wanting to make her choices without her mother judging her.

=== Ray "Ray Jay" Santino Jr. ===
Ray "Ray Jay" Santino Jr. (Patrick Johnson; Seasons 1–2) is Dani's teenage son who is an avid fan of T.K., often using him to get things from the Hawk's team that regular fans couldn't. Ray Jr. falls in love with his tutor Olivia and while having sex in his bedroom, Dr. Dani walks in on the both of them. Ray Jay threatens to move out and move in with Olivia instead. Ray Jay was temporarily turned into a vegan by Olivia until she told him she wanted to start college out of state, without him, the two breaking up; coincidentally at the same time as his mother and Matt Donnally. Ray Jay gets into trouble with the law when he tries to raise money for a project by planting and selling illegal drugs. In season two, he gets a job as Juliette Pittman's assistant and has a little crush on her. When she asks Ray Jay to move to Paris with her, he decides to drop out of school and join her, to Dani's disappointment.

== Recurring characters ==
=== Coach Pat Purnell ===
Coach Pat Purnell (Gregory Alan Williams) is the head coach of the New York Hawks. However, he's later fired by the new ownership, because he couldn't win a championship for the Hawks.

=== Laura Radcliffe ===
Laura Radcliffe (Andrea Anders) is a high-powered publicist hired by the Hawks to improve T.K.'s public image. She has also had a previous relationship with Matt Donnelly.

=== Jeanette Fiero ===
Jeanette Fiero (Amanda Detmer) is Dani's best friend.

=== Marshall Pittman ===
Marshall Pittman (Evan Handler) is Owner of the New York Hawks.

=== Vivica Stevens ===
Vivica Stevens (Jaime Lee Kirchner) is a reporter that T.K. begins dating, but later is dumped by T.K. after he is shot.

=== Angela Romano ===
Angela Romano (Concetta Tomei) is Dani's mother, and a gambler.

=== Damon Razor/Bryce Abbot ===
Damon Razor/Bryce Abbot (Gaius Charles) is an academic football player with a shady past who comes in as a runner-up for T.K. after he is shot. Razor abruptly quits the team learning from T.K. that he has more responsibilities to his family.

=== Rob Maroney ===
Rob Maroney (Rob Estes) is T.K.'s agent who helped T.K. on his downward spiral after dealing with being shot. Maroney is fired after T.K. gets fired off a sports drink shoot. Maroney blames Matt for being fired by T.K. and moves onto a new client, whom Matt wants to replace T.K. while he is in rehab. However, he and Donnally reconcile their differences when Donnally tries to bring another client of his to the Hawks.

=== Noelle Saris ===
Noelle Saris (Michaela McManus) is a reporter in behind Terrence King and Damon Razor, searching for Razor's past and threatening a sexual harassment suit on the team and T.K. She and Donnally become expecting parents.

=== Hank Hooper ===
Hank Hooper (Michael O'Neill) is a friend of Coach Purnell, and he was appointed by the league to be the Interim GM until the "Pittman situation" was resolved. He was impressed with Donnally. So, he promoted Donnally to Interim Assistant GM. He was eventually fired by Juliette Pittman when she inherited the team from her father.

=== Juliette Pittman ===
Juliette Pittman (Danielle Panabaker) is the daughter of Marshall Pittman. She is shown to have a father/daughter type relationship with Nico, who helps her with her addiction problems and gets her into rehab. In season 2 she inherits the team after her father's death. At the end of Season 2, she eventually sells the team for a billion dollars and decides to move to Paris, taking Ray Jay with her as her personal assistant.

=== Coach Tom Wizinski ===
Coach Tom Wizinski (David Andrews) is the new head coach and GM for the Hawks. He asks Dani to share confidential information about her patients with him, and when she refuses, he fires her.

=== Troy Cutler ===
Troy Cutler (David Anders) is Connor's second-in-command at V3. He sometimes is reluctant to give Dani information. He finds Dani to be nosy. However, Connor realizes that, but doesn't object to it, because Dani is "effective".

== Minor characters ==
- Craig Bierko as Ray Santino Sr.: Dani's ex-husband who had been cheating on her.
- Tamara Braun as Ronnie Romano: Dani's sister.
- Nadia Dajani as Margo Ciccero: Dani's friend.
- Jason Gedrick as Dr. J. D. Aldridge: Dani's former grad school professor.
- Orlando Jones as Lazarus Rollins: a rival therapist with extreme techniques which land T.K. into serious trouble.
- Liz Vassey as Gabrielle Pittman: Marshall Pittman's ex-wife and Nico's one time lover.
