= Rashad Frett =

American Filmmaker

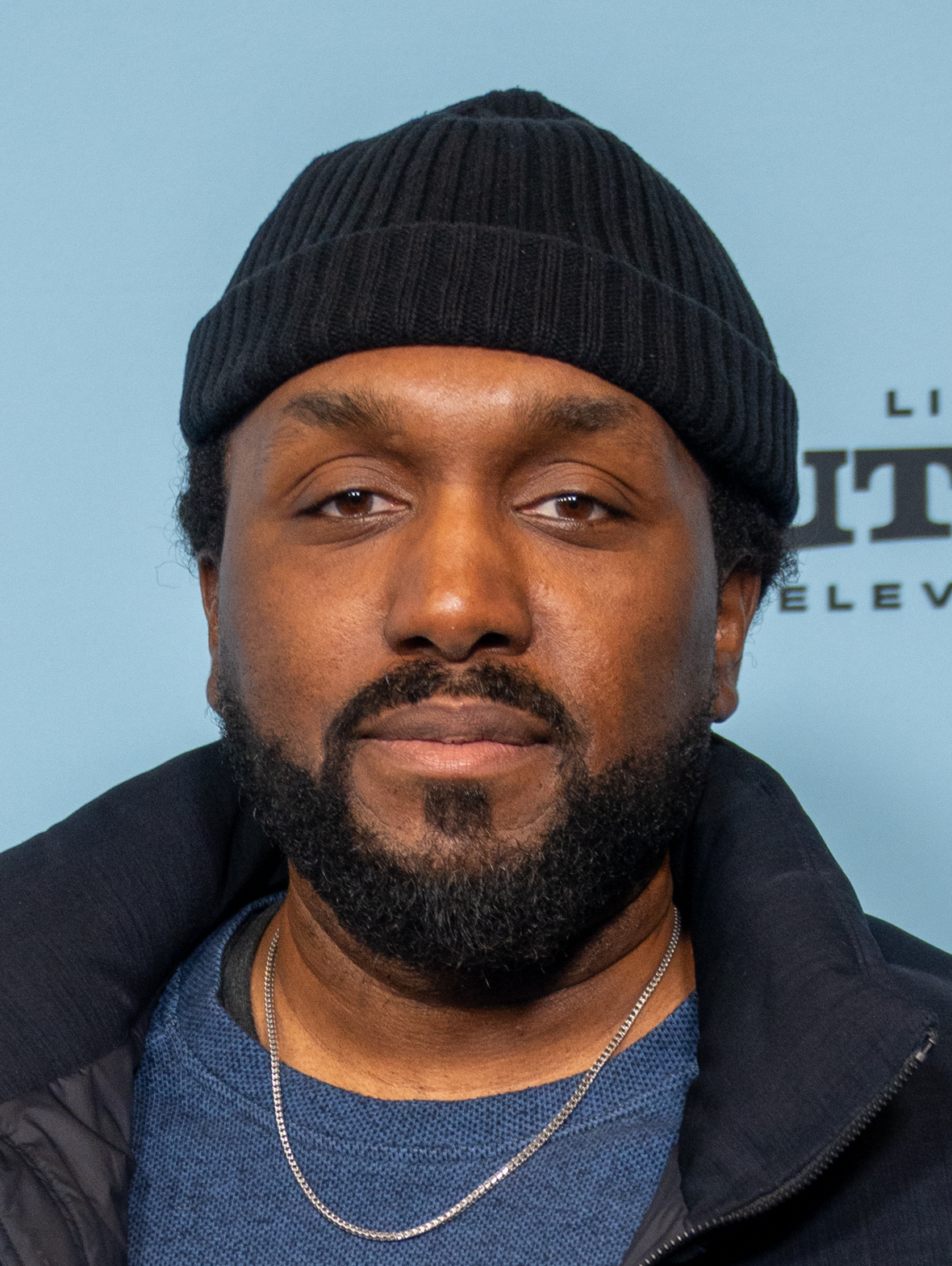
- Frett in 2025
- Born: Rashad Frett; Hartford, Connecticut, U.S.
- Education: New York University Tisch School of the Arts
- Occupations: Director; Filmmaker; Professor
- Years active: 2008–present

Rashad Frett is an American director, filmmaker, and film professor. He won the 2025 Sundance Film Festival Directing Award in the U.S. Dramatic Competition for his debut feature film Ricky. His prior work includes TV pilot The Second District (2011) which garnered mention in the Wall Street Journal.

Frett currently lives in New York City and teaches college level directing and producing classes.

== Early life and career ==
Frett was raised between the U.S. Virgin Islands and Hartford. He attended Hartford Public High School prior to joining the Army as a combat medic at the age of 17. He served as a 9/11 first responder during his time in the Army.

In 2009, he graduated from the communications program at Central Connecticut State University. Frett's first TV directing role was the result of introductions through CCSU professor and filmmaker Jeffrey Teitler, who also introduced him to two of his future co-producers on Ricky. In addition to developing TV pilot The Second District, Frett spent several years between 2009 and 2016 working for a Connecticut nonprofit and filming documentaries of incarcerated parents, then went on to attend New York University's Tisch School of the Arts, graduating in 2021. At NYU, Frett made the short film K.I.N.G. (Kid In Need of Guidance) as well as a short film version of Ricky, the two of which received awards and recognition from BAFTA, Sundance, the Directors Guild of America, and programs funded by Spike Lee, Ryan Murphy, Martin Scorsese, and Cary Fukunaga.

In 2023, Frett was signed by WME to develop short film Ricky, which he co-wrote with NYU classmate Lin Que Ayoung, into a feature. The short premiered at the 2023 Sundance Film Festival in the Short Film program, and both Frett and Lin Que were selected for the festival's Screenwriter's Lab and Intensive to develop Ricky into a feature-length film.

Of Ricky, Frett has described writing the script as "an act of revisiting memories" from his time in Hartford working with the families of incarcerated individuals, incorporating input from co-writer Lin Que Ayoung. The film was self-distributed, which The Hollywood Reporter called "a radical release strategy" and "a new model for indie distribution," and its wider reception has included community engagement screenings including at the San Quentin Rehabilitation Center men's prison.

Frett has said that his creative inspirations and mentors include Spike Lee, Jeffrey Teitler, and Seith Mann, and that Kathryn Bigelow, Ernest Dickerson, the Safdie brothers, Alejandro González Iñárritu and works like City of God are additional influences.

== Filmography ==
=== Film ===
==== As director ====
Year	Title	Notes
2014	Thicker Than Water	short film
2015	Step Up	short film
2016	Homecoming	short film
2017	Prototype	short film
2018	K.I.N.G.	short film
2020	Polaroid Stories	short film
2023	Ricky	short film - 2023 Sundance Short Film program selection
2025	Ricky	2025 Sundance U.S. Dramatic Competition selection; released in theaters April 2026

=== Television ===
Year	Title	Credit	Notes
2011	The Second District	Director	Pilot
2018	Otis	Cinematographer	S1E1 "After the Party"
