= List of Necessary Roughness episodes =

Necessary Roughness is a USA Network drama which premiered on June 29, 2011. The series stars Callie Thorne as Danielle Santino, a tough Long Island divorcee who, in order to make ends meet, gets a job as a therapist for a professional football team.

== Series overview ==
Season	Episodes	Originally released	
Season	Episodes	First released	Last released
1	12	June 29, 2011	September 14, 2011
2	16	June 6, 2012	February 20, 2013
3	10	June 12, 2013	August 21, 2013

== Episodes ==
=== Season 1 (2011) ===
No. overall	No. in season	Title	Directed by	Written by	Original release date	Prod. code	US viewers (millions)
1	1	"Pilot"	Kevin Dowling	Liz Kruger & Craig Shapiro	June 29, 2011	NR101-75	4.67
After discovering the multiple affairs of her husband of 17 years, Dr. Dani Santino (Callie Thorne) begins working for the New York Hawks as a sports therapist for the team and especially their star player, Terrence "T.K." King (Mehcad Brooks). Meanwhile, Ray (Craig Bierko), Dani's husband, attempts to win custody of their children.
2	2	"Anchor Management"	Ron Underwood	Jeffrey Lieber & Tracy McMillan	July 6, 2011	NR102	4.42
Dr. Dani begins working with a news anchor (Nicholas Bishop) after he makes some on-air mistakes. Meanwhile, T.K. is sidelined for a game and Lindsay (Hannah Marks) begins seeing a boy that Dani finds suspicious.
3	3	"Spinning Out"	Kevin Dowling	Liz Kruger & Craig Shapiro	July 13, 2011	NR103	3.99
Dr. Dani treats a NASCAR driver (Matt Barr) who needs help regaining confidence after a crash. Meanwhile, Lindsay and Ray Jay throw a party, and T.K. gets in a fight with a rookie.
4	4	"Habit Forming"	John Fortenberry	Ildy Modrovich	July 20, 2011	NR104	4.20
A fullback's rookie year is on track to be his last unless Dr. Dani determines the cause of his absence from practice. Meanwhile, sensitive information concerning Dani's patients is leaked, and Matt is reunited with a friend with some bad habits.
5	5	"Poker Face"	David Grossman	Steve Kriozere & Mark A. Altman	July 27, 2011	NR105	4.21
A professional poker player wants Dani to uncover the "tell" that is destroying his career, but there is more to his problem than meets the eye. Meanwhile, the Hawks hire a high-powered publicist (Andrea Anders) to improve TK's public image.
6	6	"Dream On"	Andy Wolk	Mark Kruger	August 3, 2011	NR106	4.46
Tyler Paxton, an extreme sports star and entrepreneur, appears fearless, but recurring nightmares are starting to threaten his success. Meanwhile, Dr. Dani attends her high school reunion, knowing Ray Sr. will be there. TK finds that there is such a thing as too much attention when he learns that he has a stalker. At the reunion, Jeanette dreams of falling in love with Gerald, who turns out to be a transgender woman called Geraldine (Candis Cayne).
7	7	"Whose Team Are You On?"	Elodie Keene	Antoinette Stella	August 10, 2011	NR107	4.14
Dr. Dani must intervene when fighting breaks out amongst the players' wives. Meanwhile, Nico helps Mr. Pittman's daughter (Danielle Panabaker) with a problem. And TK—who is getting back on a downward spiral—begins to seek a new therapist after Dr. Dani tells him he has overstepped boundaries she has set for her children.
8	8	"Losing Your Swing"	Gloria Muzio	Tracy McMillan	August 17, 2011	NR108	4.21
Dr. Dani treats a rising golf star with the "yips". Meanwhile, TK gets a new therapist, Lazarus Rollins (Orlando Jones), and a former professor (Jason Gedrick) of Dani's sparks her interest.
9	9	"Forget Me Not"	Kevin Hooks	Damani Johnson & Ildy Modrovich	August 24, 2011	NR109	4.19
A successful female boxer (Alyssa Diaz) seeks Dr. Dani when she inexplicably begins losing fights and her memory. Laz (Orlando Jones) continues to corrupt T.K., and Matt is asked to move out of the city to take a new job.
10	10	"A Wing and a Player"	Tim Hunter	Steve Kriozere & Mark A. Altman	August 31, 2011	NR110	4.00
A mascot with self-destructive tendencies and the Hawks' playoff curse keep Dani busy.
11	11	"Baggage Claim"	John Kretchmer	Story by : Colin Sweeney; Teleplay by : Liz Kruger & Craig Shapiro	September 7, 2011	NR111	3.71
When a mogul's (Gail O'Grady) way of life puts her empire in danger, she seeks Dani's help. In the meantime, Dani nears her first anniversary after her divorce, and Nico receives a visit from Marshall Pittman's wife. Nico quickly learns that Pittman's wife plans on leaving him, taking the Hawks with her. T.K., meanwhile, works to begin a real relationship with Vivica (Jaime Lee Kirchner).
12	12	"Goal Line"	Kevin Dowling	Jeffrey Lieber & Scott D. Shapiro	September 14, 2011	NR112	4.01
As the Hawks head into the playoffs, T.K. must face off against his lifelong rival (Terrell Owens). Meanwhile Dr. Dani takes on an unexpected new client and Nico has to decide where his loyalties lie.

=== Season 2 (2012–13) ===
No. overall	No. in season	Title	Directed by	Written by	Original release date	Prod. code	US viewers (millions)
13	1	"Shrink or Swim"	Elodie Keene	Liz Kruger & Craig Shapiro	June 6, 2012	NR201	3.01
The Hawks begin facing problems even before the football season begins. The team's owner, Marshall Pittman (Evan Handler), is getting divorced from his wife, who is trying to take control of team. Nico tries to locate Pittman's daughter, wondering if she has gotten into further trouble or is hurt. Meanwhile, Dr. Dani tries to hide her relationship with Matt while dealing with Ray Jay, who begins to sleep with his tutor. T.K. tries to deal with getting shot without any help from Dr. Dani.
14	2	"To Swerve and Protect"	Rob Morrow	Natalie Chaidez	June 13, 2012	NR202	2.67
After a roller derby star suddenly collapses, she approaches Dani for help. Ray Jay has a fight with his girlfriend. T.K. is forced to make a choice.
15	3	"Wide Deceiver"	Kevin Dowling	Story by : Scott D. Shapiro; Teleplay by : Jeffrey Lieber	June 20, 2012	NR203	3.01
A new recruit named Damon Razor (Gaius Charles) is sent to Dr. Santino for evaluation. T.K. goes to a restaurant at his old neighborhood and buys it, wanting to get away from the stress of playing football for the Hawks, but he later rejoins the team, still in pain. Meanwhile Dani is annoyed by Ray Jay's new girlfriend, Olivia, who turns her children into vegans, and Marshall Pittman seeks out Nico to bug the team, but Nico decides to bug Pittman instead. Nico learns Dr. Dani's recruit is not who he says he is, his name was actually Bryce Abbot, and he always wanted to play football, and Matt and Dani ponder if they want to have children together.
16	4	"Slumpbuster"	Kevin Hooks	Will McRobb & Chris Viscardi	June 27, 2012	NR204	2.96
Dr. Santino works with a baseball slugger named Gonzo (Adam Rodriguez) who has had trouble hitting the ball due to a narcissistic syndrome. Meanwhile, Marshall Pittman begins exhibiting some strange behavior, later firing Nico for bugging him and afterwards breaking down at a meet with his ex-wife and their attorney's, Pittman confessing his love for her, although Gabby wants to get out of the marriage. And T.K. must deal with his wound by seeking help from a Chinese physical therapist, requested by Matt, who is bonding with Ray Jay and Lindsay, while simultaneously weakening his and Dani's relationship.
17	5	"Mr. Irrelevant"	Craig Shapiro	Mark Kruger	July 11, 2012	NR205	2.65
Dr. Dani works her magic on a very popular illusionist (Paul Blackthorne) whose next trick could prove to be his last. In addition, Dani tells her children about her ongoing relationship with Matt as he learns to navigate front office politics. Plus, T.K. gets into a Twitter flame war with an all-too-familiar foe (Terrell Owens).
18	6	"What's Eating You?"	Andy Wolk	Ildy Modrovich	July 18, 2012	NR206	2.81
Dr. Santino gets a new patient who plays football and his weight isn't directly caused by eating, but by tremendous stress. Meanwhile Dr. Dani has to deal with her daughter who is seeing her own shrink Dr. Crosetti (Amy Sedaris), Lindsay wanting to help the poor people who live in Africa. Also T.K. and Damon Razor get wrapped up in a hazing each other to a point where Nico has to step in and intervene to keep the two players from being kicked off of the team. And Dr. Santino's friend Jeanette tells Dani some shocking news, and Jeanette learns some news from Matt concerning Dani.
19	7	"Spell It Out"	Tim Hunter	Damani Johnson	July 25, 2012	NR207	2.76
Dr. Dani gets a patient who is an elementary school student in a spelling bee contest who has suddenly begun stuttering. Dr. Dani discovers the student may not have a stage fright problem, but a girl problem. Meanwhile T.K. prepares to testify against the man who shot him in a bar last year. Also Jeanette ponders her baby's future while Matt wishes to be engaged to Dani, but Dani decides that she can't crush Matt's dream of wanting to have children of his own one day, so they decide to break off their relationship. And in the midst of Marshall Pittman's divorce, the League is looking into Matt's history while he is general manager.
20	8	"A Load of Bull"	Anton Cropper	Colin Sweeney	August 1, 2012	NR208	2.06
While Dr. Santino and Matt ponder their relationship status, Dr. Dani has a patient, who is a bull rider, that never properly grieved after his father's death. A reporter (Michaela McManus) comes in to interview the team, mainly T.K. and Damon Razor (Gaius Charles), asking questions regarding T.K.'s shooting and the aftereffects and also asking Damon Razor about his childhood life. Coach Purnell, Dr. Dani, Matt, and Nico discover T.K. is exhibiting some strange behavior after an interview with the reporter. Nico tells the reporter to back off of T.K. and Damon, but she threatens that she has a sexual harassment suit against a team player. Nico and Matt have to choose to believe her or T.K., they initially believe T.K. until Nico finds security video of the Hawks locker room where T.K. flashed the reporter. Meanwhile, Ray J.'s girlfriend Olivia breaks up with him shortly before she moves away and in the end, Matt is back with Dr. Dani.
21	9	"Might as Well Face It"	Daniel Sackheim	Will McRobb & Chris Viscardi	August 15, 2012	NR209	2.49
Dani works with a professional gamer; Dani and Matt learn that there is an upside to their breakup; the Hawks start cutting players after training season ends; and T.K. attempts to help Razor with a problem but finds out one of his own in the process.
22	10	"Double Fault"	James Hayman	Natalie Chaidez	August 22, 2012	NR210	2.57
Dr. Santino works with a young couple who play tennis, later learning that the couple are swingers, and Matt and Nico have to deal with the possibility of everyone involved with the Hawks being exposed to the press after learning everyone on the team was being bugged, including Dr. Santino. Meanwhile T.K. is in a downward spiral with his addiction to painkillers, later firing his own agent. While Nico comes to Dani's side when her patient's personal lives are at stake, T.K. finds himself in a terrible situation behind the wheel. And Jeanette chooses to move to Spain with her boyfriend Augusto (Mario Cimarro), and their soon-to-be child.
23	11	"All the King's Horses"	David Grossman	Liz Kruger & Craig Shapiro	August 29, 2012	NR211	2.87
Dr. Santino and the team force T.K. to go to rehab, where he meets an old friend (Michael Imperioli) in the music business. Matt successfully deals with the hole in the lineup—recruiting a player represented by T.K.'s former agent—and is confirmed in his new job. Ray J's plan to obtain college money goes seriously awry, landing him in deep trouble with the law. Pittman's plane crashes after he settles accounts with Dani, and while attempting to determine his fate, Nico and Dani deepen their relationship.
24	12	"Frozen Fish Sticks"	Kevin Dowling	Story by : Scott D. Shapiro; Teleplay by : Jeffrey Lieber	January 23, 2013	NR212	2.37
After 28 days, TK is back from rehab and faces competition for his old job. Pittman's young daughter Juliette has inherited the team; she also meets Ray J, who has escaped his legal trouble with a sentence of community service. Dani finds herself unable to either resume her practice or resolve her conflicting feelings for Matt and Nico. She seeks professional help from her former teacher (Peter MacNicol).
25	13	"Hits and Myths"	John T. Kretchmer	Ildy Modrovich & Damani Johnson	January 30, 2013	NR213	1.97
Dani attempts to reconcile the feuding principals of her favorite rock band. Juliette's interference as owner disrupts both the team and TK's recovery. Dani tells Dr. Gunner about her dreams, which involve both Nico and Matt in scenes from classic romantic films.
26	14	"The Fall Guy"	Arlene Sanford	Scott D. Shapiro	February 6, 2013	NR214	1.86
A visit from Dani's mother and sister leads to the revelation of a disturbing family secret. Coach Purnell's erratic behavior threatens his job; when Nico uncovers the reason for it, he is able to convince Juliette to sell the team. TK attempts to bond with his quarterback Rex Evans (Travis Smith) through turkey hunting, but becomes convinced that his football comeback is failing, leading to a setback in his recovery. Juliette expresses a romantic interest in Ray J.
27	15	"Regret Me Not"	John Fortenberry	Story by : Joe Sabatino & Donna Dannenfelser; Teleplay by : Mark Kruger	February 13, 2013	NR215	2.03
Dani discovers that Rex is dealing with a personal secret. TK gets a new AA sponsor, who helps him deal with his physical limitations. Nico learns that moves Pittman made before his death now make the sale of the team problematic. After working through her feelings about her mother, Dani decides she wants Matt back, but Matt appears to have moved on.
28	16	"There's the Door"	Kevin Dowling	Liz Kruger & Craig Shapiro	February 20, 2013	NR216	1.98
Rex comes out as gay to TK and asks his support in going public. The news leaks that the Hawks have a gay player, and the resulting dissension hurts the team's play and leads Rex to reconsider. But at halftime with the team losing, TK first claims to be the gay player and then gives an inspiring speech, leading Rex to come out to the team and rallying them to victory. Meanwhile Matt has no longer moved on from Dani, Ray J leaves for Paris as Juliette's personal assistant over Dani's objections, and Nico accepts a job with Mark Cuban. But as Nico is leaving he is detained for questioning by law enforcement.

=== Season 3 (2013) ===
No. overall	No. in season	Title	Directed by	Written by	Original release date	Prod. code	US viewers (millions)
29	1	"Ch-Ch-Changes"	Kevin Dowling	Liz Kruger & Craig Shapiro	June 12, 2013	TBA	2.61
Six months later, the Hawks have hired a new coach and general manager, a disciplinarian who fires Dani as team therapist when she insists on patient confidentiality. Dani learns that Nico did not go to Dallas when he approaches her on behalf of sports agent Connor McClane (John Stamos), who needs her to treat the crippling anxiety issues of a top pitching prospect. She does so and McClane offers her a full time job with his firm V3, on condition that she end her private practice and work for him exclusively. TK, after talking with Dani, decides to remain with the Hawks in the hope that the new coach's harsh methods will lead to a championship. Matt, who has been with his pregnant other girlfriend, takes a new job in Boston. Both Nico and McClane's chief of staff Troy Cutler appear to be worried that Dani will discover some secret within McClane's firm.
30	2	"Gimme Some Lovin'"	Kevin Dowling	Mick Betancourt	June 19, 2013	TBA	2.51
Dani begins work at V3 with the case of a young actress whose instability is making her unemployable. TK asks Connor to represent him so that he can continue to see Dani; Connor explains that his erratic past makes booking endorsements for him a challenge. An interview with a potential advertiser turns out to be a test arranged by Connor, which TK passes. It is revealed that Nico is investigating V3 for someone else, who is pleased that he has befriended Troy. Nico warns his employer that Dani must be protected from any consequences from the investigation.
31	3	"Swimming With Sharks"	James Hayman	Ildy Modrovich	June 26, 2013	TBA	2.65
Connor asks Dani to help a basketball player who has gone cold from the free throw line, although he is represented by rival agency SBG. This leads to a war between the two agencies, with SBG partner Abby Bruce (Connor's former assistant) trying to woo away TK. Using this war as cover, Nico has V3's computers hacked in the interest of his own investigation, and installs a hacker as a second agent within V3. Dani has difficulty making connections with Lindsay but makes progress in setting boundaries with her assistant Paloma.
32	4	"Snap Out of It"	Elodie Keene	Damani Johnson	July 10, 2013	TBA	2.11
Connor introduces Dani to his friend and client, a self-help guru who denigrates talk therapies and whose strange behavior invites her professional attention. TK's new girlfriend Sheera Kane (Kate Miner) is a Stanford business major as well as a model, and is taken with his entrepreneurial ideas. Encouraged by Paloma, Dani receives the attentions of a visitor from V3's LA office. Nico determines that Troy is keeping a separate set of V3 books. He gives them to the federal agent he is working with (to clear himself from charges stemming from Pittman's operations) and asks in addition to see someone named Alex Careles who is being held by ICE.
33	5	"V3 For Vendetta"	Rob Morrow	Mark Kruger	July 17, 2013	TBA	2.56
The FBI raid V3's offices and seize evidence under a sealed warrant. Connor and Troy suspect SBG, but a senior V3 finance officer named Carl comes to Dani and says that he is to blame, as he has been stealing from the company. Dani urges him to confess and seek a plea deal, and arranges for an interview with an FBI contact of Nico's. But Carl instead commits suicide, leaving Dani a brief note and a flash drive. Meanwhile, Troy enlists Paloma to spy on Dani, Nico sets a deadline for the end of his cooperation with the Federal agent, Sheera helps TK attend a charity event and still make his pre-game curfew, and Dani's new LA friend breaks off their relationship after a mutually satisfying fling.
34	6	"Good Will Haunting"	John Fortenberry	Colin Sweeney	July 24, 2013	TBA	2.45
When a sex tape of TK and Sheera appears on the internet, the Hawks' coach vows to trade TK to Buffalo as punishment for the curfew violation. Connor uses all his skills to get TK traded instead to New Jersey, where he is reunited with Coach Parnell. When TK learns that Sheera released the tape, he breaks off their relationship. Paloma has a chance to steal the flash drive for Troy, but decides to remain loyal to Dani. Dani shows the drive to Nico, who has it decrypted and finds that Carl (who has been haunting Dani in dreams) was using the charity foundation to move V3 money to the Cayman Islands. Dani helps a novelist with his writer's block.
35	7	"Bringing the Heat"	Tim Hunter	Scott D. Shapiro	July 31, 2013	TBA	2.51
Hutch, the pitching prospect who was Dani's first patient through V3, has renewed anxiety issues. On the eve of his call-up to the majors, he suddenly announces his retirement, leaves V3, and disappears. Dani insists on continuing to help him in spite of her exclusivity contract, leading her to briefly quit before Connor apologizes and asks her to stay. Nico travels to the Caymans and finds that the "children's hospital" to which Carl was sending money is a vacant lot owned by an auto mechanic in New Jersey. He hacks the mechanic's computer and finds more money laundering, including payments to Joseph Crabcheck, a former student at V3's baseball academy who appears to be at the center of Hutch's hidden issues. Dani demands that he tell her everything about the money laundering in spite of his fears for her safety, and he finally kisses her and agrees to tell her everything. Meanwhile, TK attempts to break it off with Sheera, but after makeup sex, an episode of property destruction, and a tearful speech, he instead becomes engaged to her. Also, Connor discovers that Troy is lying to him about his travel schedule and Paloma is temporarily replaced by an incompetent intern while dealing with a "family emergency".
36	8	"The Game's Afoot"	Kevin Hooks	Ildy Modrovich & Donna Dannenfelser	August 7, 2013	TBA	2.34
Nico tells all to Dani, who admits affection for him but does not want to pursue a relationship at this time. He is able to track down Crabcheck, who is coaching under an assumed name in Connecticut, but Crabcheck will not talk to Dani. Connor learns from his lawyer that the investigation will soon lead to indictments, and that Troy is plotting to take over V3. Both Connor and Troy approach Bruce of SBG as a potential ally. Paloma pursues a harassment case against Troy, but he outmaneuvers and fires her. TK is injured in practice, and is offered an "experimental treatment" at the V3 clinic that could make him better than before but requires him to sign a nondisclosure agreement. Crabcheck finally visits Dani and tells her that although he is bound by nondisclosure agreements, she should look into the V3 clinic. Meanwhile, Dani counsels two sisters who must learn to work together on a relay team.
37	9	"Sucker Punch"	Greg Prange	Story by : Mick Betancourt; Teleplay by : Damani Johnson & Joe Sabatino	August 14, 2013	TBA	2.35
A boxer comes to Dani for counseling, then kisses her in public, and a photo of the kiss is dropped off at Dani's house. Paloma at first rebuffs Dani's help, but then tells Connor about Troy's severance payment to her. Connor fires Troy over the payment to Paloma and what he says is the attempt to blackmail Dani, but actually he is paying the boxer himself. Paloma returns to her job. Troy asks Abby to record a conversation with Connor that could compromise him and force him to yield V3, but Abby instead records Troy confessing. TK has reservations about the treatment, though Sheera encourages him to proceed with it. Nico meets with TK and gets him to remove some of the drugs from the clinic, which Nico then gives to the FBI. The FBI agent (who previously had questioned Dani and was rebuked by Nico for it) thanks Nico and tells him that he is free to leave for Dallas, and that Alex Careles will also be freed. Nico announces his departure plans to Dani, who kisses him and leads him to her bedroom.
38	10	"Sympathy For the Devil"	Craig Shapiro	Liz Kruger & Craig Shapiro	August 21, 2013	TBA	2.36
Alex Careles is Nico's wife, who he claims to have married for professional reasons and who is divorcing him. As the clinic is raided, Troy talks to the FBI but cannot implicate Connor. Connor plans to leave for Brazil, leaving Abby in charge of V3. Just as he leaves, he has a private conversation with Dani, who has learned from Hutch that Connor knew about the illegal treatments. He admits his guilt to Dani, who leaves him with his conscience in exchange for Connor's arranging a new tryout for the unenhanced Hutch. The unenhanced and no longer engaged TK attempts to get ready for the key game with the Hawks, with the help of his physical therapist India, whom he hired away from the V3 clinic before the raid. He is able to play a few downs and make a key contribution to the Bobcats' win, but his season is ended (something he accepts with newfound maturity). Nico tells Dani more about himself, including that he has declined the job in Dallas; they prepare to leave for a vacation together on Nico's so-far-unexplained private plane.
