= Mr. Iglesias =

2019 American sitcom

- Genre: Sitcom
- Created by: Kevin Hench
- Starring: Gabriel "Fluffy" Iglesias; Sherri Shepherd; Jacob Vargas; Maggie Geha; Richard Gant; Cree Cicchino; Fabrizio Guido; Tucker Albrizzi
- Theme music composer: Ozomatli
- Composer: Joseph LoDuca
- Country of origin: United States
- Original language: English
- No. of seasons: 2 (3 parts)
- No. of episodes: 21 + 1 Crossover Episode

Production
- Executive producers: Kevin Hench; Gabriel Iglesias; Ron DeBlasio; Joe Meloche; Andy Ackerman; Peter Murrieta
- Producers: Chris Arrington; Isaac Gonzalez
- Cinematography: Peter Smokler
- Editor: Scott Hill
- Camera setup: Multi-camera
- Running time: 26–32 minutes
- Production companies: Hench in the Trench Productions; Fluffy Shop Studios

Original release
- Network: Netflix
- Release: June 21, 2019 – December 8, 2020

Mr. Iglesias is an American sitcom that premiered on Netflix on June 21, 2019. The series stars Gabriel Iglesias who executive produces alongside Kevin Hench, Joe Meloche, and Ron DeBlasio. In August 2019, the series was renewed for a second season which premiered on June 17, 2020. A bonus crossover episode set before the second half of season 2 was released under "Olympic Effort" under the name Game On: A Comedy Crossover Event on August 10, 2020

The second part of the second season premiered on December 8, 2020.

In July 2021, the series was canceled after two seasons.

== Premise ==
Mr. Iglesias follows "a good-natured public high school teacher who works at his alma mater. He takes on teaching gifted but misfit kids to not only save them from being "counseled out" by a bully bureaucrat Assistant-Principal, but also to help them unlock their full potential."

== Cast and characters ==
=== Main ===
- Gabriel "Fluffy" Iglesias as Gabe Iglesias, a patient and easy-going history teacher at Woodrow Wilson High School in Long Beach, California who uses his knack for telling jokes to teach and inspire his students. He recently quit drinking alcohol at the show's beginning and regularly attends Alcoholics Anonymous meetings. Aside from his friends and students, his greatest loves in life are professional wrestling and his Volkswagen Bus.
- Sherri Shepherd as Paula Madison, the thrice-divorced principal at Wilson High. A former teacher, her record is stated to be very impressive. She is constantly searching for a new sexual partner and has a profile on virtually every dating app.
- Jacob Vargas as Tony Ochoa, the honors history teacher at Wilson High and Gabe's loyal but lazy best friend. He has a gambling problem and is attracted to Abby.
- Maggie Geha as Abby Spencer, the absent-minded and naïve rookie history teacher at Wilson High. She doesn't feel the same way toward Tony as he feels about her. She is religious and quotes verses from the Bible
- Richard Gant as Ray Hayward, Gabe and Tony's old teacher who still teaches English at Wilson High. He is known for being sarcastic and has an estranged relationship with his wife, whom he only references when he asks people not to tell her about what he does.
- Cree Cicchino as Marisol Fuentes, Gabe's favorite student, who is highly intelligent and always does well in school. She works three jobs in addition to her studies. She develops feelings for Mikey during the school play, and they eventually kiss and become a couple. Gabe and Mr. Hayward have to entice her into applying to Stanford since she has the grades to have a shot at getting in.
- Fabrizio Guido as Mikey Gutierrez, one of Gabe's slow-witted but good-hearted students who has a crush on Marisol; the two eventually kiss during the mid-season two finale and they become a couple.
- Tucker Albrizzi as Walt (season 2; recurring season 1), one of Gabe's troubled but humorous students who's into Jamaican culture, especially Reggae and marijuana.

=== Recurring ===
- Oscar Nunez as Carlos Hernandez, Wilson High's strict, egotistical, and socially incompetent assistant-principal. Both the faculty and student body hate him, and he frequently clashes with Gabe. He attempted to kick Gabe's students out of school due to their effect on the school's status in the first season, but failed. He reforms in the next season and attempts to teach theatre to students and becomes more friendly, though he is still socially inept.
- Coy Stewart as Lorenzo, one of Gabe's students, is Walt's best friend. He is a funny but paranoid conspiracy theorist who constantly worries about government surveillance. Lorenzo begins dating Rita Perez in season 1, and it is revealed in season 2 that she and Lorenzo are still together a year later.
- Gloria Aung as Grace, one of Gabriel's students often described as "weird" who's into hacking. At the beginning of season 1, Grace is so shy that she has to use a text-to-speech program on her computer to talk to anyone except Gabe. With Gabe's help and encouragement, she starts to come out of her shell and be able to talk to people.
- Bentley Green as Rakeem Rozier (season 1), the entitled star running back who recently transferred from Abby's class to Gabe's class at Wilson High. He was originally an arrogant procrastinator due to initially getting limitless time on assignments and was told by Coach Dixon that he should "stay in his lane", i.e. focus on football to the exclusion of all else, until Gabe encouraged Rakeem to try studying and become better at other things.
- Kathryn Feeney as Katie, a waitress at the DeBlasio's Restaurant and later at Roxanne's, where the teachers hang out outside of work
- Christopher McDonald as Coach Dixon, the dimwitted and obnoxious football coach at Wilson High. He values athletics over academics and has a "slight" alcoholism issue.
- Chris Garcia as Mr. Gomez, a science teacher at Wilson High
- Jesus Trejo as Mr. Trujillo, another science teacher at Wilson High. He's always seen with Mr. Gomez.
- Brooke Sorenson as Whitney (season 2), a less-than-humble, privileged honors student who joins Mr. Iglesias' class.
- Elora Casados as Jackie (season 2), the new guidance counselor and Gabe's new love interest. Casados made her acting debut after serving as the set costumer for the series.

=== Guest stars ===
- Megyn Price as Jessica Dobbs, Walt's mother. She is divorced from Walt's father and regularly attends the same Alcoholics Anonymous meeting group that Gabe goes to. She and Gabe have a mutual attraction, but decide not to pursue it until Gabe has reached 1 full year of sobriety, in order to not run the risk of Gabe falling off the wagon.
- Ron Pearson as Jim, the school janitor who can juggle and balance objects on his chin. He wins the school talent show in season one.
- Joel McHale as Danny, Abby's ex-fiancé. It's revealed that he is cheating on her and Abby breaks up with him. In "Oh Boy, Danny", he comes to Long Beach to win back Abby, but she rejects him. At the end of the episode, he announces his intention to finish out his contract in South Dakota and then move permanently to Long Beach to earn back Abby's trust.
- Maria Quezada as Rita Perez, a tough student who has priors and a crush on Lorenzo, which she hides by acting rude and aggressive.
- Jo Koy as Bob, a Filipino-American who owns a taco food truck
- Franco Escamilla as Joaquin Fuentes (season 2), Marisol's musician father who maintains a strained relationship with her due to his estrangement from his family

== Episodes ==
=== Series overview ===
Season	Episodes		Originally released
1	10		June 21, 2019
2	11	6	June 17, 2020
2	11	5	December 8, 2020

=== Season 1 (2019) ===
No. overall	No. in season	Title	Directed by	Written by	Original release date
Part 1
1	1	"Some Children Left Behind"	Andy Ackerman	Kevin Hench	June 21, 2019
2	2	"Summer School"	Leonard R. Garner Jr.	Luisa Leschin	June 21, 2019
3	3	"Full Hearts, Clear Backpacks"	Phill Lewis	Isaac Gonzalez	June 21, 2019
4	4	"The Wagon"	Phill Lewis	Peter Murrieta	June 21, 2019
5	5	"Everybody Hates Gabe"	Leonard R. Garner Jr.	Sam Sklaver	June 21, 2019
6	6	"Bullying"	Victor Gonzalez	Jacque Edmonds Cofer	June 21, 2019
Lorenzo keeps missing class, and Gabe tries to get to the bottom of it. Learning that it is because of a girl bullying him, he reports the girl, Rita Perez, to Paula, who doesn't suspend her for bullying Lorenzo, but suspends her for violating the new school guidelines by calling Lorenzo "negrito", which she finds offensive to African-Americans. Gabe tries to fix it upon learning Rita wasn't bullying Lorenzo, but dating him. Meanwhile, Marisol is dismayed after the pamphlet describing the new guidelines uses the term "Latino" instead of "Latinx".
7	7	"Talent Show"	Trevor Kirschner	Julia Ahumada Grob	June 21, 2019
Guest: Ron Pearson as Janitor Jim
8	8	"Teachers' Strike"	Jody Margolin Hahn	Aaron Serna	June 21, 2019
9	9	"Oh Boy, Danny"	Jody Margolin Hahn	Chris Garcia	June 21, 2019
10	10	"Academic Decathlon"	Gloria Calderón Kellett	D.J. Ryan	June 21, 2019

=== Season 2 (2020) ===
No. overall	No. in season	Title	Directed by	Written by	Original release date
Part 2
11	1	"True Calling"	Andy Cadiff	Kevin Hench	June 17, 2020
After receiving a college prep pep talk from Mr. Iglesias, Mikey decides to drop out of high school. Ray tells Gabe to teach Mikey about ikigai to allow him to learn his life's purpose. Gabe does so, only to fail, and force him to question his own career path. After being inspired by Tony, Gabe manages to convince Mikey to not drop out.
12	2	"Taming the Carlos"	Bob Koherr	Peter Murrieta	June 17, 2020
Gabe encourages his class to join Carlos's drama class. They all sign up, only to find the class boring. Gabe attempts to teach Carlos how to teach and encourages him enough to make his class fun for the students. Meanwhile, Paula urges the staff to change bars after she got banned from her local one for throwing a flaming margarita at someone. The staff changes bars and they spend the night drinking.
13	3	"Party of One"	Betsy Thomas	Luisa Leschin	June 17, 2020
Gabe encourages Paula to delete all the dating apps on her phone and to take a break from dating. Later, Carlos tells his class they will be performing the play Romeo and Juliet, which Mikey and Walt get roles for, respectively. Paula reveals to Gabe she didn't take a break from dating and got a date with Coach Winslow, known around town as a player, who told her he's changed. Mikey convinces Walt to allow Marisol to play Juliet, who gains feelings for Mikey once she starts acting. Gabe finds out Winslow hasn't changed and lies to him that Paula broke up with him, causing Paula to believe Gabe loves her. Paula attempts to flirt with Gabe, only to learn the truth.
14	4	"Generation Why"	Jonathan Judge	Michael Shipley	June 17, 2020
Marisol tells the class they're the only school not participating in Green Week, a district competition to reduce each school's carbon footprint. After the class complains that adults are the reason for global warming, Gabe convinces Paula to allow the school to join the competition. After an argument ensues, Paula cancels Green Week for the school, but after learning the competition offers a grant to the winner, she allows it to continue. Gabe's class informs him the only way they can win, is if Gabe gives up driving his van. Though hesitant, Gabe gives in. Later, the class informs him he can keep his van, as long as he carpools the staff.
15	5	"Food for Thought"	Jonathan Judge	Isaac Gonzalez	June 17, 2020
After winning Green Week, Marisol tells Gabe she wants the class to tackle the issue of cultural appropriation, by supporting Jorge, who had his taco truck drove out from the school's parking lot by Bob, who's Filipino. The class argues that Bob is nicer than Jorge, and even makes better tacos, but Marisol argues that he shouldn't have the right to profit off Mexican culture. Agreeing with Marisol, Paula kicks Bob and his truck out of the school. Later, Gabe and Tony help Bob sneak and sell tacos inside the school, where Bob reveals that he pumps his cows with steroids and GMO's, making the tacos last longer and taste better. With Gabe's help, Marisol and Bob talk it out and work together to combine their grandmothers' recipes instead. Meanwhile, Carlos lets Paula join his play when she threatens to cancel it.
16	6	"Where Art Thou Counselor?"	Victor Gonzalez	Julia Ahumada Grob	June 17, 2020
The class prepares to take their final exams, and Gabe allows his students to stay after class to talk about their concerns. Lorenzo talks about his stress-levels, Grace talks about her anxiety, Walt talks about his want for a driver's license, Mikey talks about his crush on Marisol, and Marisol talks about her anxiety on messing up at the school play. They all receive words of encouragement from Gabe. Later, Mikey questions whether he should kiss Marisol in the performance, the staff encourages Gabe to start dating again, and Gabe begs Paula to hire a guidance counselor for his students. Marisol and Mikey talk about the kiss and they agree to do it cheek-to-cheek. While performing, Marisol and Mikey do the aforementioned kiss, but after they pull back, Marisol surprises both of them by kissing him on the lips, causing him to forget his lines. At night, the staff goes to a bar, and Gabe begins to flirt with a woman he meets. Paula arrives and reveals the woman Gabe flirted with, Jackie, is the new guidance counselor at the school.
Part 3
17	7	"Technically Speaking"	Phill Lewis	D.J. Ryan	December 8, 2020
After entering his request to Paula, Gabe receives a box of tablets to give to his students, who have all moved into their junior year of high school. In class, Gabe finds out that he doesn't have enough tablets for each of them, so he goes to the teacher's lounge to talk to Paula. Once there, Gabe reunites with Jackie, who tells him that technology might not be as good as it seems. To test his students, Gabe decides to give them a quiz, comparing the scores of the students with the tablets (Team Tech) to the students without (Team No-Tech). After reviewing their scores, Gabe finds out that Team Tech outperformed Team No-Tech (91 to 88). Later that same day, Gabe and Jackie decide to start dating. Meanwhile, Mikey tries to find the courage to ask out Marisol on a date, who happily accepts when he finally does.
18	8	"Good Things"	Jody Margolin Hahn	Chris Garcia	December 8, 2020
After everyone in class discusses who has the hardest life based on race, gender, and ethnicity, Gabe tries to talk to the other teachers, who begin to have a similar discussion. To fix his students' pessimism on life and their futures, Gabe gives them an assignment in which they have to create a vision board listing good things they believe they deserve. Encouraged by Gabe, Marisol announces her plans to become the first person in her family to go to college, specifically, Stanford University. Meanwhile, Gabe questions whether he's good enough for Jackie, and after finding inspiration from his students, Gabe and Jackie share a kiss.
19	9	"Playing Favorites"	Jody Margolin Hahn	Natasha Chandel	December 8, 2020
At a parent-teacher conference, Gabe has unsettling conversations with Grace's mother, who isn't happy that she is talking more, Mikey's father, who isn't happy that Mikey is thinking of going to college and Lorenzo's mother, who accuses him of calling Marisol his favorite student in front of the whole class. The next day, Lorenzo tells Gabe not to worry, as he's everyone's favorite teacher. Meanwhile, Paula and the teachers compete for better parking spaces through peer evaluations. As Tony bribes the others to give him a good review, he ends up losing out while Ray is the winner.
20	10	"You're Dad to Me"	Jody Margolin Hahn	Peter Murrieta	December 8, 2020
At school, Gabe meets with musician Joaquin Fuentes, Marisol's estranged father, who he helps reunite with his daughter. Using Gabe's advice, Marisol decides to spend time with her dad, by skipping the semester to go on tour with him. That same week, Walt begins to attend driving lessons with Gabe. In one of their driving trips, the pair meet with Joaquin to convince him to let Marisol finish school. Meanwhile, Paula and the teachers begin to participate in yoga classes, in which Paula unleashes her true feelings over her upcoming college reunion. After Carlos tells Paula that she should retire, Paula overcomes her emotions to attend the reunion. At the end of the day, Walt earns his driver's license.
21	11	"The Big Dance"	Jonathan Judge	Grace Condon & Zachary Gonzalez-Landis	December 8, 2020
Gabe's class prepares for the holiday dance before winter break. After realizing that his students don't want to go to the dance, Gabe uses the help of Jackie to convince them to attend, only to find out later in the day that Paula has canceled the activity. To bring the dance back, Gabe tells Paula that he has to use the school gym for a "meeting", which a cheerful Paula later attends. After a dance battle, Gabe and Jackie share the party's last dance.

== Production ==
=== Development ===
On April 26, 2018, Netflix announced that it had given the production a series order for a first season consisting of ten episodes. Executive producers were set to include Gabriel Iglesias and Kevin Hench. On August 17, 2018, it was announced that Joe Meloche and Ron DeBlasio were joining the series as executive producers and that Peter Murietta, Luisa Leschin, and Sam Sklavar would serve as co-executive producers. On April 24, 2019, it was announced the series would premiere on June 21, 2019. On August 8, 2019, Netflix renewed the series for a second season of 12 episodes with the first part premiering on June 17, 2020. The second part of the second season premiered on December 8, 2020. On July 2, 2021, Netflix canceled the series after two seasons when Gabriel contracted COVID-19.

=== Casting ===
Alongside the initial series order announcement, it was confirmed that Gabriel Iglesias would star in the series. On August 17, 2018, it was announced that Jacob Vargas, Maggie Geha, and Cree Cicchino had been cast as series regulars. In September 2018, it was reported that Richard Gant and Sherri Shepherd had been cast in main roles and that Tucker Albrizzi would appear in a recurring capacity. In October 2018, it was announced that Fabrizio Guido had joined the cast in a series regular role and that Megyn Price and Coy Stewart had been cast as recurring characters. On September 6, 2019, Tucker Albrizzi was promoted to be a series regular for the second season.

== Reception ==
The review aggregation website Rotten Tomatoes provides an 88% approval from 8 reviews and an average rating of 8/10.

== See also ==
- Game On: A Comedy Crossover Event
