= Ricky (2025 film) =

- Theatrical release poster
- Directed by: Rashad Frett
- Written by: Rashad Frett; Lin Que Ayoung
- Produced by: Rashad Frett; Pierre M. Coleman; Simon Taufique; DC Wade; Josh Peters; Sterling Brim; Cary Joji Fukunaga
- Starring: Stephan James; Sheryl Lee Ralph; Titus Welliver; Maliq Johnson; Imani Lewis; Simbi Kali; Andrene Ward-Hammond
- Cinematography: Sam Motamedi
- Edited by: Daysha Broadway
- Music by: Simon Taufique
- Production companies: Ossetra Films; Bay Mills Studios; Parliament of Owls; Spark Features; Good Gravy Films; The deNovo Intuitive
- Distributed by: Blue Harbor Entertainment
- Release dates: January 24, 2025 (Sundance); April 24, 2026 (United States)
- Running time: 109 minutes
- Country: United States
- Language: English
- Box office: $41,513

Ricky is a 2025 American drama film, directed and produced by Rashad Frett, in his directorial debut, from a screenplay by Frett and Lin Que Ayoung. It is an expansion of the 2023 short film of the same name by Frett. It stars Stephan James, Sheryl Lee Ralph, Titus Welliver, Maliq Johnson, Imani Lewis, Simbi Kali and Andrene Ward-Hammond.

It had its world premiere at the 2025 Sundance Film Festival on January 24, 2025. It was released on April 24, 2026, by Blue Harbor Entertainment.

== Premise ==
After being imprisoned in his teenage years, Ricky, now an adult, navigates the challenges of life post-incarceration.

== Cast ==
- Stephan James as Ricardo "Ricky" Smith
- Sheryl Lee Ralph as Joanne
- Titus Welliver as Leslie Torino
- Maliq Johnson as James
- Imani Lewis as Jaz
- Simbi Kali as Winsome
- Andrene Ward-Hammond as Cheryl
- Sean Nelson as Terrence

== Production ==
In January 2023, it was announced Rashad Frett would direct a feature-length version of his short film of the same name. The screenplay was selected for the 2023 Sundance Institute Screenwriting Lab.

== Release ==
The film had its world premiere at the 2025 Sundance Film Festival on January 24, 2025. In January 2026, Blue Harbor Entertainment was announced to be distributing the film, setting the release for April 24, 2026.

== Reception ==
On the review aggregator website Rotten Tomatoes, 90% of 41 critics' reviews are positive. The website's consensus reads: "Anchored by Stephan James' soulful performance and Rashad Frett's assured direction, Ricky is a raw, empathetic, and quietly powerful parable that delivers a moving gut punch through its realistic portrayal of life after incarceration." Metacritic, which uses a weighted average, assigned the film a score of 79 out of 100, based on 10 critics, indicating "generally favorable" reviews.
