= Little Boxes (film) =

- Theatrical release poster
- Directed by: Rob Meyer
- Written by: Annie Howell
- Produced by: Jared Ian Goldman; Jordan Horowitz; Ken H. Keller; Caron Rudner
- Starring: Melanie Lynskey; Nelsan Ellis; Armani Jackson; Oona Laurence; Janeane Garofalo; Christine Taylor
- Cinematography: Tom Richmond
- Edited by: Marc Vives
- Music by: Kris Bowers
- Production companies: Kid Noir Productions; Mighty Engine; Related Pictures; Gilbert Films
- Distributed by: Gunpowder & Sky
- Release dates: April 15, 2016 (Tribeca Festival); April 14, 2017 (limited)
- Running time: 84 minutes
- Country: United States
- Language: English

Little Boxes is a 2016 American independent dramedy film, directed by Rob Meyer and written by Annie Howell. It stars Melanie Lynskey, Nelsan Ellis, Armani Jackson, Oona Laurence, Janeane Garofalo, and Christine Taylor. The film had its world premiere at the Tribeca Film Festival on April 15, 2016. It was released theatrically in the United States on April 14, 2017 by Gunpowder & Sky, receiving generally positive reviews.

== Plot ==
An interracial family struggles to adjust when they move from Brooklyn, New York to a small town in Washington State.

== Cast ==
- Melanie Lynskey as Gina McNulty-Burns
- Nelsan Ellis as Mack Burns
- Armani Jackson as Clark Burns
- Oona Laurence as Ambrosia Reed
- Janeane Garofalo as Helene Wisdom-Finkelstein
- Christine Taylor as Joan Reed
- Miranda McKeon as Julie Hanson
- Maliq Johnson as William
- Nadia Dajani as Maya
- Veanne Cox as Sarita
- David Charles Ebert as Tom Gibson
- Will Janowitz as Steve
- Julie Hays as Dean Maureen
- Dierdre Friel as Diane Hanson

== Production ==
In May 2015, it was announced Rob Meyer would direct the film from a screenplay by Annie Howell, with Cary Fukunaga executive producing. In August 2015, Melanie Lynskey and Nelsan Ellis were reported to have been cast in the leads.

== Release ==
The film had its world premiere at the Tribeca Festival on April 15, 2016. Shortly after, Netflix acquired VOD rights to the film. Gunpowder & Sky later acquired distribution rights and set the film for an April 14, 2017, release.

== Reception ==
The film received generally positive reviews from critics, earning a 67% score on Rotten Tomatoes. Neil Genzlinger of The New York Times wrote, "Countless movies have examined what happens when a country mouse goes to the city; this one shows that leaving a gentrified urban oasis for a small-town world can be just as jolting," calling it "effective" and "delicately observed."
