= Cree Cicchino =

American actress (born 2002)

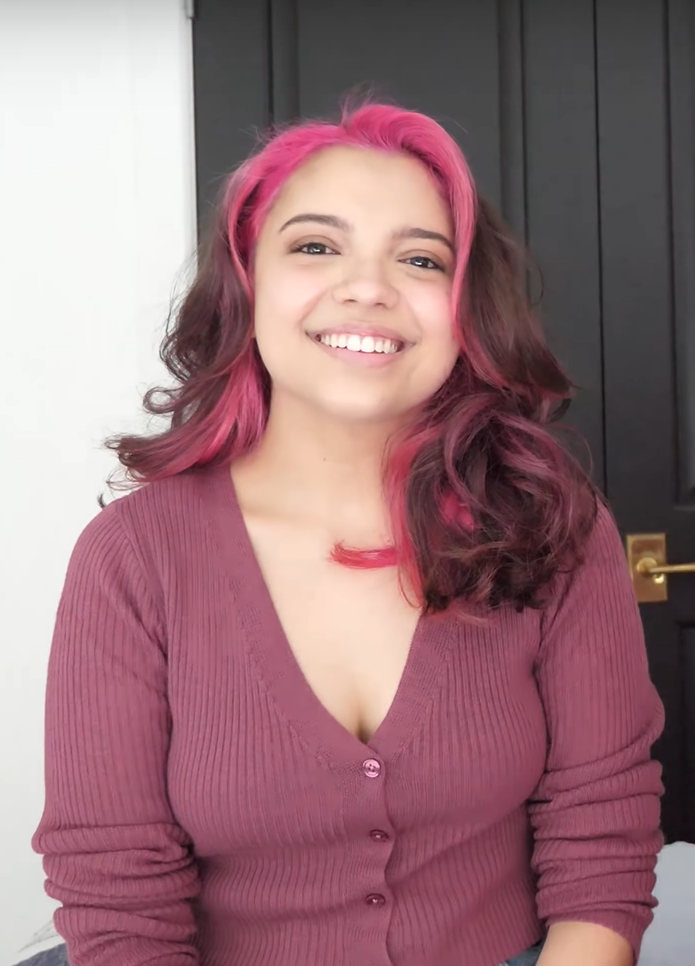
- Cicchino in the Vlogbrothers video, Hello! Meet Daisy!, in 2022
- Born: May 9, 2002 (age 24)
- Other name: Cree
- Occupation: Actress
- Years active: 2015–present

Cree Cicchino (born May 9, 2002 and known mononymously as Cree) is an American actress.

She began her career as a child actress playing one of the lead characters, Babe, in the Nickelodeon comedy television series Game Shakers, which aired from 2015 to 2019. She went on to portray Marisol Fuentes in the Netflix comedy television series Mr. Iglesias, Mim in the 2020 Netflix film The Sleepover, and Daisy in the 2024 film Turtles All the Way Down.

She currently stars as Elaine Denton in the Fox television series Best Medicine, which premiered in January 2026.

== Early life ==
Cicchino grew up in Glendale, Queens, New York City. She has Italian and Ecuadorian ancestry. She has a twin sister, named Jayce.

Cicchino started dancing at age four. Her mother put her in acting classes at 11 or 12 years old, after which she decided she wanted to be an actress.

== Career ==
In 2015, at age 13, Cicchino was cast in leading role of Babe in the Nickelodeon television comedy series Game Shakers, which ran for three seasons. In August 2018, she was cast in the role of Marisol Fuentes on the Netflix comedy series Mr. Iglesias, which debuted in 2019. In August 2019, Cicchino was cast as Mim, best friend to Clancy (whose parents are kidnapped), in the Netflix film The Sleepover, released in August 2020. In July 2021, she was cast as Luisa Torres in the HBO Max limited television series And Just Like That..., based on Sex and the City.

Cicchino starred as Daisy Ramirez in the film Turtles All the Way Down, directed by Hannah Marks and released on HBO Max (known as Max at the time of the film's release) in May 2024. She is credited by only her first name in the film, having revealed her decision to continue her career mononymously as Cree in a Zach Sang podcast the week before its release. Of the name change, she stated "it just felt the most comfortable", and that it marked her moving into a "new era" with her acting when she entered her twenties.

== Filmography ==
Television and film roles
Year	Title	Role	Notes
2015–2019	Game Shakers	Babe	Main role
2015	Nickelodeon's Ultimate Halloween Costume Party	Herself	Host; television special
2015	Nickelodeon's Ho Ho Holiday	Fred	Television special
2015–2017	Whisker Haven	Seashell	Voice role; 4 episodes
2016	Nickelodeon's Ultimate Halloween Haunted House	Herself	Television special
2017	Paradise Run	Herself	Contestant; 3 episodes
2017	Henry Danger	Babe	Crossover episode: "Danger Games"
2018	Me, Myself & I	Julia	Episode: "There She Goes"
2018	The Adventures of Kid Danger	Quinn	Voice role; episode: "Mad Wax"
2019–2020	Mr. Iglesias	Marisol Fuentes	Main role
2020	The Sleepover	Mim	Streaming film
2021–2022	And Just Like That...	Luisa Torres	Recurring role, 7 episodes
2022	Stay Awake	Melanie	Film
2022	Robot Chicken	Bubbles / Nellie / Alice	Voice role; episode: "May Cause a Squeakquel"
2022	FBF	Annie	
2022–2023	Big Sky	Emily Arlen	Recurring role (season 3), 13 episodes
2024	Turtles All the Way Down	Daisy	Streaming film; credited as Cree
2025	Twinless	Bianca	Credited as Cree
2026	Best Medicine	Elaine Denton	Main role; credited as Cree

== Accolades ==
Year	Awards	Category	Title	Result	Refs
2017	Imagen Awards	Best Young Actor – Television	Game Shakers	Nominated	
2018	Imagen Awards	Best Young Actor – Television	Game Shakers	Nominated	
2024	Imagen Awards	Best Supporting Actress – Film	Turtles All the Way Down	Won	
