= Best Medicine =

2026 American television series

- Genre: Medical drama; Comedy drama
- Based on: Doc Martin by Dominic Minghella
- Developed by: Liz Tuccillo
- Starring: Josh Charles; Abigail Spencer; Josh Segarra; Cree; Annie Potts; Stephen Spinella; Jason Veasey
- Music by: Jeff Cardoni
- Country of origin: United States
- Original language: English
- No. of seasons: 2
- No. of episodes: 21

Production
- Executive producers: Jamie Babbit; Tyson Bidner; Jaime Eliezer Karas; Mark Crowdy; Philippa Braithwaite; Rodney Ferrell; Howard T. Owens; Ben Silverman; Liz Tuccillo; Josh Charles
- Producers: Tony Glazer; Summer Crockett Moore; Raymond Quinlan
- Cinematography: Wesley Cardino; John G. Inwood; Matthew J. Santo
- Editors: Sheri Bylander; Vanessa Procopio; Karen K.H. Sim; Sean Cusack; Sky Gewant; Kate Pedatella
- Running time: 41–43 minutes
- Production companies: All3Media International; Propagate Content; Tuccillo, Inc.; Fox Entertainment Studios

Original release
- Network: Fox
- Release: January 4, 2026 – present

Best Medicine is an American medical comedy drama television series created by Dominic Minghella. The show is based on the popular British television series Doc Martin. That series' lead actor, Martin Clunes appeared as a guest actor. The show premiered on Fox on January 4, 2026. In March 2026, Fox renewed the series for a second season, which premiered on September 20, 2026.

== Premise ==
Brilliant but brusque Dr. Martin Best moves from a prestigious hospital position in Boston to a private practice in the small fishing village of Port Wenn, Maine, where his aunt lives and where he summered as a child. As he solves mysteries behind unusual health conditions affecting the townsfolk, he struggles to integrate with them as well as dealing with his past: he walked away from being a surgeon in Boston after developing a pathological blood phobia, resulting from an operation on a young girl who reminded him of his older sister, Rosemary, who died in a car crash as a child.

== Cast ==
=== Main ===
- Josh Charles as Dr. Martin Best, a successful and brilliant Harvard Medical School-educated heart surgeon with a lack of bedside manner and a severe blood phobia
- Abigail Spencer as Louisa Gavin, a teacher at the community school, later the school’s principal
- Josh Segarra as Mark Mylow, the town's sheriff and Louisa's ex-fiancé
- Cree as Elaine Denton, Dr. Best's administrative assistant and licensed phlebotomist.
- Annie Potts as Aunt Sarah, Dr. Best's aunt, a local lobster woman
- Stephen Spinella as Greg Garrison (season 2; recurring season 1), the proprietor of The Salty Breeze restaurant
- Jason Veasey as George Brady (season 2; recurring season 1), Greg's husband and the executive chef of The Salty Breeze

=== Recurring ===
- Carter Shimp as Al Large, Bert's son and coworker who becomes interested in Elaine
- John DiMaggio as Bert Large, a local contractor
- Clea Lewis as Sally Mylow, Mark's mother, who is the town's pharmacist
- Michael Potts as Gilbert Carlisle, Dr. Best's first patient upon arrival in town
- Didi Conn as Geneva Potter, a senior Port Wenn resident
- Ben Lewis Doherty as Peter Cronk, one of Louisa's students
- Patch Darragh as Glendon Ross, Dr. Best's childhood bully who continues to harass Best as an adult
- Cindy De La Cruz as Jeannie
- Watson as Copernicus, an initially unnamed stray dog who repeatedly enters Dr. Best's house against his wishes
- Eliza Coupe as Dr. Eden Montgomery, a doctor who Dr. Best previously dated when he lived in Boston and refers Louisa to when she decides to have a child on her own
- Jack Cutmore-Scott as Parker (season 2), Louisa's new love interest
- Katey Sagal as Kathleen Gaven (season 2), Louisa's estranged mother

== Episodes ==
=== Series overview ===
Season	Episodes	Originally released	
Season	Episodes	First released	Last released
1	13	January 4, 2026	April 7, 2026
2	14	September 20, 2026	February 2, 2027

=== Season 1 (2026) ===
No. overall	No. in season	Title	Directed by	Written by	Original air date	Prod. code	U.S. viewers (millions)
1	1	"Docked"	Jamie Babbit	Teleplay by : Liz Tuccillo	January 4, 2026	101	3.69
Martin Best, MD, leaves his hospital job in Boston to begin a home private practice in the small fishing village of Port Wenn, Maine, where he vacationed as a child. Most of the locals are friendly, though schoolteacher Louisa Gavin finds his lack of bedside manner off-putting. Martin learns he has inherited receptionist and would-be influencer Elaine Denton from the late Dr. Reese, the previous town doctor; and his first patient, Gilbert, has gynecomastia. At the supermarket, another village resident makes Martin faint when she asks him to help with their son's scraped knee, revealing his blood phobia that cost him his former position. Outside the supermarket, Gilbert's wife, Susan, asks Martin to refill her estrogen cream prescription, which leads Martin to deduce that Gilbert has been absorbing the cream during sex, causing his gynecomastia. Martin's aunt Sarah, a local lobster woman, fakes an emergency to get her nephew to visit so she can ask about his move; he flees when a lobster clips her finger. Later, Louisa informs him that she recently left her fiancé, Sheriff Mark Mylow, at the altar. Martin and Gilbert then witness Susan kissing Doug, a younger gynecomastia patient, on his houseboat. Incensed, Martin prepares to drive away, only to be deliberately stopped by Sarah's oncoming truck. He admits that he froze during a heart operation on an eight-year-old girl who had been in a car accident but refuses to talk further when Sarah mentions "Rosemary". On his way into The Salty Breeze, the village's restaurant, Doug punches his nose during a scuffle, and he retreats to the bathroom, where Elaine, whom he had earlier fired, promises to keep his secret. Mark opens up to Martin about Louisa leaving him and expresses hope that Martin changes his mind, which he does. As Martin removes the "For Rent" sign outside his house, a stray dog he has been trying to keep out runs inside yet again.
2	2	"Bean There Done That"	Jamie Babbit	Liz Tuccillo	January 13, 2026	102	3.32
An outbreak of the "brown-tailed moth rash" plagues Port Wenn, with an introduction to Peter Cronk at the start of the episode. With the Baked Bean Supper around the corner, sponsored by Glendon Ross, Martin's childhood bully, Martin must find the cause of this sudden onset of disease. As everyone in Port Wenn comes down with this sudden illness, Martin cancels the Baked Bean Supper leading to outcry and him being shunned by the town until he can find the cause. When the stray dog comes into his office intensely scratching, Martin figures out that he must be the cause, leading him to dump the dog on Mark's doorstep, effectively reinstating the Supper, until Louisa admits she never once pet the dog. After being told that Glendon has been doing construction work and everyone has been by his house, Martin investigates, finding mice and effectively pausing Glendon's construction for the next six months. Martin, though reluctant, ends up going to the Supper, but leaves early due to Glendon dumping his plate in his lap and the two get into a spat that leads to Glendon to stop sponsoring the Baked Bean Supper. Louisa stops by Martin's place and gives him a plate of the food at the event and in the moment, Martin admits how he once had a sister and that she died.
3	3	"Take Me Out of the Ballgame"	Jaffar Mahmood	Cindy Chupack	January 20, 2026	103	3.10
It is the annual showdown between Bar Harbor and Port Wenn school baseball team and the star player, Glendon Junior (Glendon Ross's son) accidentally injures himself while practicing with Al and Mark. Unsure of his diagnosis, Martin advises Glendon about how it may be something more serious, only for Junior to bend down and Martin to trip over him, subsequently breaking his arm and ruining Port Wenn's chance at winning against Bar Harbor. In the meantime, Elaine kicked herself out of her own home due to her mom, living temporarily at Martin's home and Louisa is on her own quest to make more female friends. Sarah is also in a skirmish with Eddy McCroy, a Bar Harbor Woodpecker's fan who she despises. Skeptical about how easily Junior's arm broke, Martin, now ostracized by the town and on the receiving end of everybody's ire for ruining their chance at the championship, goes forth to try and find the cause, only to be hit by a restraining order from Glendon. This is only broken when Louisa has to call Martin for help due to Junior being in crippling pain, leading to him crawling through a window and discovering that Junior has been bulking up with too much protein powder, causing his bones to de-calcify and become brittle. At the game, Elaine mentions needing a place to live, leading Louisa to offer her home, saying she has an extra room and the two become roommates. Martin also attends the game, and seeing that Junior is playing (broken arm and all) rushes out to stop him from hitting the ball, subsequently disqualifying Port Wenn but saving Junior from shattering more of his body. In an emotional scene, Junior admits to Glendon that him bulking up led to his brittle bones and that Martin was only protecting him. Glendon drops the restraining order and pending lawsuit against Martin, but implies that he knows something about Martin that could ruin his career if he ever pulled a stunt like this again. Sarah and Eddie McCroy end up making out passionately after the game, something to which Louisa and Martin watch in shock.
4	4	"All the World's Ablaze"	Jaffar Mahmood	Elizabeth Evans	January 27, 2026	104	3.50
It's Blaze day in Port Wenn! A day in when all the ladies in Port Wenn go to the woods and have a survival group session with a man named Blaze, a naturalist medicine guy who is fawned over by the Port Wenn ladies for his good looks. When needing a volunteer for the "dead man's carry" multiple ladies throw themselves at him, spurred on in jealousy due to Louisa having favoritism with the man, leading to Blaze needing to get x-rays at Martin's office due to his back, to which he leaves pre-maturely and Martin can't talk to him about his other symptoms. In the background, when a case of stomach bug happens, seemingly caused by the Teens going to Salty Breeze for Liam's Birthday, Martin heads to the Salty Breeze, discovering Brisket roaming in the food prep areas which leads to him calling the state inspector, who, up until the very end upon an offhanded comment by Martin, nearly successfully prevent Brisket from being discovered. Upon the discovery of Brisket, the Salty Breeze is shut down leading to Greg, George, and the entire town to once again turn on Martin, including Aunt Sarah who rips into him over not seeing the value of Brisket and how much care Greg and George put into the restaurant. However, Elaine is overjoyed since her mom was getting remarried to a man she dubs "Dumb Dumb", someone in which she heavily disapproves of. Martin get's the results of the EKG and discovers that Blaze may be at risk for an aortic dissection, leading to him rallying the ladies of Port Wenn (who all hate him at the moment) to help track the wilderness instructor down. In a comedic moment, the ladies of Port Wenn demonstrate that they are all competent in navigating the wilderness and only play up the "idiotic" behavior for Blaze's attention. Louisa offers to go with Martin in the search since no one wants to pair up with him and the two share a nice moment, with Martin catching her as she trips that almost leads to a kiss before Martin spots blood and he ruins it by trying not to vomit. The ladies of Port Wenn find Blaze collasped and they cart him out of the woods after fawning over doing CPR on him and get him to Bar Harbor. Martin discovers the food poisoning is caused by spoiled beef at the school cafeteria from Louisa's comment, something of which we learn "Dumb Dumb" (Principal Holloway), was fully aware of but did it due to budget constraints. Martin comes back home and discovers Elaine drunk, ending up comforting her and talks her into going to her mother's wedding. Brisket returns, now a registered ESA so she can be in the (now-opened) Salty Breeze once again. Elaine ends up throwing up on Martin's shoes.
5	5	"Hello Darkness, My Port Wenn"	Jaime Eliezer Karas	Matt Ward	February 3, 2026	105	3.29
6	6	"Eyewitness Blues"	Jaime Eliezer Karas	Scott Prendergast	February 10, 2026	106	3.06
As Port Wenn prepares for their annual blueberry festival, Louisa prepares to compete in the blueberry pie contest hoping to finally beat Sally Mylow. Martin and Sarah argue over her not taking her health seriously due to her unhealthy eating habits. Martin meets "Blue Barry", the mascot of the festival, who apparently turned blue after eating too many blueberries.
7	7	"There Might Be Blood"	Jason Winer	Peter Ackerman	February 17, 2026	107	2.92
The town prepares for its annual festival themed around Blood Factory, a poorly-written but popular vampire novel set in Port Wenn. Martin struggles to keep his blood phobia private upon being invited while responding to routine medical requests. Louisa suddenly becomes ill, but Martin cannot deduce her condition based on her symptoms. The citizens protest his efforts to shut down the Blood Factory event on suspicion of a faulty HVAC, and Louisa fires him as her doctor. Martin briefly considers whether Louisa might be pregnant by Mark but figures out she has hemochromatosis. Though he knows the blood in the Blood Factory exhibit is fake, he braves traveling through it and faints as he reaches to rescue Louisa from accidentally poisoning herself from shellfish. They wake up about to be rolled into ambulances, and Martin rises from his bed and almost declares his feelings for Louisa before she rehires him as her doctor. Meanwhile, Elaine talks to Al about her plans to eventually leave Port Wenn. He tries to create a perfect romantic meeting that leads to their first kiss, but her plans remain unchanged.
8	8	"The Bogfather"	Jason Winer	Ria Tobaccowala	February 24, 2026	108	2.85
Mark, George, and Bert are reenacting an early part of Port Wenn's history when a corpse with a bullet wound in its chest surfaces from below the bog. As the townsfolk rally to solve the mystery, Martin starts acting uncharacteristically kind, realizing that operating on this type of corpse is like operating on a living body without the risk of drawing blood. He uses the excuse that his patients have been failing to follow his medical advice and enjoys working on a patient that will not give him any problems. Geneva claims to a suspicious Mark that the corpse was her husband and tries to turn herself in for murdering him, but evidence mounts that the corpse dates back to colonial America. Martin panics while attempting to draw blood from Louisa's arm and rants about the problems his patients have caused for him; she denounces him as the town doctor. A DNA analysis proves that the victim was an ancestor of Martin's, a recluse shot and killed in a duel by a man with support from the entire town. Meanwhile, another DNA test reveals that Al is not Bert's biological son; he hides the truth from Elaine, claiming the test indicated that he is double-jointed, but confirms with her that they are now officially a romantic couple. Martin finally admits his blood phobia to Louisa, who consoles him.
9	9	"Doc Martin"	Todd Holland	Elizabeth Evans	March 3, 2026	109	2.81
Martin is surprised when his parents, Vanessa and Robert (guest star Martin Clunes), arrive in Port Wenn, trying to convince him to return to Boston. A family reunion turns sour when Robert gives Sarah some unexpected news. Martin is suspicious of Robert's odd and secretive behavior. Louisa gets some shocking information about the school. The whole town prepares for the annual "Sleep-In," when they have a sleepover at the school.
10	10	"Port Wenn-ings and a Funeral"	Todd Holland	Scott Prendergast	March 10, 2026	110	2.98
11	11	"Mind Your Own Buboes"	Marcos Siega	Matt Ward	March 24, 2026	111	2.99
12	12	"A Tale of Two Sister Cities"	M.J. Delaney	Cindy Chupack	March 31, 2026	112	2.74
13	13	"Norway No How"	Jaime Eliezer Karas	Liz Tuccillo	April 7, 2026	113	2.95

=== Season 2 (2026) ===
No. overall	No. in season	Title	Directed by	Written by	Original air date	Prod. code	U.S. viewers (millions)
14	1	"Be Careful What You Fish For"	Nancy Hower	Liz Tuccillo	September 20, 2026	201	N/A
15	2	"Breakin' In Is Hard to Do"	Rebecca Asher	Scott Prendergast	September 29, 2026	202	N/A
16	3	"Crate Expectations"	Jaime Eliezer Karas	Cindy Chupack	October 6, 2026	203	N/A
17	4	"No Place Like Om"	Kevin Bray	Ria Tobaccowala	October 13, 2026	204	N/A
18	5	"Hare Today, Gone Tomorrow"	Brad Silberling	Marshall Heyman	October 20, 2026	205	N/A
19	6	"Can't Stop the Healing"	Jaime Eliezer Karas	Peter Ackerman	November 3, 2026	206	TBD
It is an unfortunate start to Martin's day when he spots Parker and Louisa kissing, later being interrupted by Mark who struggles to tell him about last nights encounter with Eden. In a terrible mood and made worse by Savannah (appeared in S1, episode 10) coming back to Port Wenn to practice homeopathic medicine, Martin meets Carson McClain, a famous food critic who orders him to give her a cortisone shot for her back. Due to Savannah taking all of Martin's patients due to the fact that he isn't one to listen to people's troubles, he ends up going to confront her, watching Carson stand and be convinced that the two are running a scam.
20	7	"Love Is a Battlefield"	MJ Delaney	Jacquelyn Reingold	November 10, 2026	207	TBD
21	8	"Back to the Suture"	Robin Givens	Elizabeth Evans & Ryan McGarry	November 17, 2026	208	TBD

== Production ==
=== Development ===
On May 9, 2025, Best Medicine received a straight-to-series order from Fox. The series is wholly owned and produced by Fox Entertainment. Doc Martin was brought to the United States by Propagate Content, alongside All3Media. The American adaptation is written and executive produced by Liz Tuccillo. Propagate's Ben Silverman is an executive producer with Rodney Ferrell, Tuccillo, and Doc Martin executive producers Mark Crowdy and Philippa Braithwaite.

On March 2, 2026, Fox renewed the series for a 12-episode second season, which was later expanded to 14 episodes.

=== Casting ===
The cast is led by Josh Charles as Dr. Martin Best. In July 2025, Abigail Spencer, Josh Segarra, Annie Potts, and Cree joined the main cast. In September 2025, Didi Conn, Clea Lewis, Stephen Spinella, Jason Veasey, John DiMaggio, Carter Shimp, Cindy De La Cruz, and Wattson (a dog) were cast in recurring roles. In October, it was announced that original Doc Martin star Martin Clunes would appear in the role of Martin Best's father. In August 2026, it was reported that Jack Cutmore-Scott joined the cast in a recurring capacity for the second season. In November 2026, Katey Sagal was cast in a recurring role for the second season.

=== Filming ===
On August 5, 2025, it was reported that the series began filming in Cornwall, New York.

== Broadcast ==
The series premiered on Fox on January 4, 2026. The second season premiered on September 20, 2026.

== Reception ==
The series holds a 73% approval rating on review aggregator Rotten Tomatoes, based on 15 critic reviews with an average of rated reviews of 6.2/10. The website's critics consensus reads, "Best Medicine may not refine the medical procedural genre but it does offer something far more enchanting: compassion, heart and a charming lead that graces all." Metacritic, which uses a weighted average, assigned a score of 62 out of 100 based on 11 critics, indicating "generally favorable" reviews.
