= The Sleepover =

2020 American action comedy film

- Official poster
- Directed by: Trish Sie
- Written by: Sarah Rothschild
- Produced by: Mickey Liddell; Pete Shilaimon
- Starring: Sadie Stanley; Maxwell Simkins; Ken Marino; Cree Cicchino; Lucas Jaye; Karla Souza; Enuka Okuma; Erik Griffin; Joe Manganiello; Malin Åkerman
- Cinematography: Conrad W. Hall
- Edited by: Jonathan Schwartz
- Music by: Germaine Franco
- Production company: LD Entertainment
- Distributed by: Netflix
- Release date: August 21, 2020
- Running time: 100 mins
- Country: United States
- Language: English

The Sleepover is a 2020 American action comedy film directed by Trish Sie and written by Sarah Rothschild. The film stars Sadie Stanley, Maxwell Simkins, Ken Marino, Cree Cicchino, Lucas Jaye, Karla Souza, Enuka Okuma, Erik Griffin, Joe Manganiello, and Malin Åkerman. It follows a teenager who discovers her seemingly ordinary mother is a former master thief in witness protection, prompting her and her friends to embark on a rescue mission when her parents are kidnapped by criminals, forcing her mother to pull off one last heist.

The Sleepover was released on August 21, 2020, by Netflix. It received mixed reviews from critics.

== Plot ==
In Boston, teenager Clancy Finch is invited by her crush, Travis Schultz, to a party. Her younger brother Kevin is humiliated when older students film him dancing in a school bathroom, but their mother Margot, a strict lunch monitor, intervenes. The video of Kevin dancing and Margot scolding the bullies goes viral, garnering over two million views on YouTube.

After Clancy is grounded for arguing with her parents about attending Travis's party, she and her friend Mim sneak out during a sleepover. Meanwhile, Kevin and his friend Lewis witness two strangers break into the Finch home, force Ron (Clancy and Kevin’s father) at gunpoint, and demand Margot—whom they call “Matilda”—accompany them. Margot agrees and leaves behind a necklace as a clue.

The kids discover a U.S. Marshal named Henry Gibbs sneaking into their home and, assuming he’s an intruder, tie him up. He reveals that Margot is in witness protection, having once turned in a major crime syndicate boss. The viral video exposed her identity.

Following clues Margot left behind, the kids uncover a hidden storage unit that serves as her former spy headquarters. They take a self-driving spy car to Travis’s party, then attempt to reach downtown Boston via Travis’s boat, but are stopped by the Coast Guard. They swim ashore and find Margot’s friend Jay, who helps track Margot’s location to a high-profile gala. The kids escape Jay's watch and head to the event.

At the gala, Margot, Ron, and her ex-fiancé, Leo Bouchot—once presumed to be in witness protection—attempt to steal the Queen of Moldana’s crown. However, Ron accidentally ingests the knockout drug intended for the Queen, causing a scene. The trio is captured but soon escapes. They reunite with the kids at the gala, and all seven flee to Leo’s safe house.

There, it’s revealed that Leo is actually the new head of the syndicate. He and his associate Elise plan to frame the family for the theft. With quick thinking, Ron creates a distraction, Margot overpowers Elise, and they escape. During a final confrontation, Margot kicks the crown out of Leo’s hands, and Clancy catches it. Leo and his crew are arrested by Boston Police.

Back home, life returns to normal. Clancy is allowed to attend a summer music program at Berklee, and the family resumes their lives, now closer and with newfound respect for Margot’s past.

== Cast ==
- Sadie Stanley as Clancy Finch, a young girl who is the daughter of Ron and Margot
- Maxwell Simkins as Kevin Finch, the brother of Clancy
- Ken Marino as Ron Finch, an awkward pastry chef who is the father of Clancy and Kevin
- Cree Cicchino as Mim, a social media-obsessed friend of Clancy and Kevin
- Lucas Jaye as Lewis, an uptight friend of Kevin
- Karla Souza as Jay, the best friend of Margot
- Enuka Okuma as Elise / Dark Figure, a criminal that knows Matilda
- Erik Griffin as Henry Gibbs, a United States Marshals Agent
- Joe Manganiello as Leo, Matilda's ex-fiancé who becomes the new leader of the crime syndicate that Matilda was a part of
- Malin Åkerman as Margot Finch / Matilda, a former thief for a crime syndicate who is in the witness protection program operating as a lunch monitor
- Harry Aspinwall as Baxter / Pizza Guy, who delivers pizzas
- Matthew Grimaldi as Travis Schultz, Clancy's love interest
- Marissa Carpio as Mrs. Patoc
- Savanna Winter as Emma / Mean Girl
- Daniel Washington as Head of Security
- Jasbir Mann as King of Moldana
- Enku Gubaie as Queen of Moldana

== Production ==
In August 2019, it was announced that Malin Åkerman, Ken Marino, Joe Manganiello, Erik Griffin, Karla Souza, Enuka Okuma, Sadie Stanley, Maxwell Simkins, Cree Cicchino, and Lucas Jaye had joined the cast of the film. Trish Sie was confirmed to direct from a screenplay by Sarah Rothschild. The film was produced by LD Entertainment and distributed by Netflix.

=== Filming ===
Principal photography began in August 2019.

== Release ==
The Sleepover was released on August 21, 2020, on Netflix.

== Reception ==
On the review aggregator website Rotten Tomatoes, The Sleepover holds an approval rating of 67% based on 21 reviews, with an average rating of 6.2/10. The site's consensus notes the film's lighthearted tone and appeal for younger audiences. On Metacritic, the film has a weighted average score of 46 out of 100, based on 9 critics, indicating "mixed or average reviews."

Benjamin Lee of The Guardian called the film "a family-friendly farrago of whimsical silliness," likening it to Spy Kids but with “a bit more polish.” He found it "good-hearted and fun," despite its formulaic approach. Christy Lemire of RogerEbert.com gave The Sleepover 2 out of 4 stars, noting that while the film starts with charm and promise, it eventually "descends into lazy plotting and uninspired action sequences." The New York Times referred to The Sleepover as "a patchwork of better films," noting that its central premise is derivative but suggesting its upbeat spirit might still engage younger viewers.

IndieWire’s Kate Erbland called The Sleepover "predictable but energetic," crediting its cast and pacing for making it a passable option for family movie night, despite a lack of originality. The Hollywood Reporter described it as "inoffensive and easily digestible," commending the charisma of the adult leads, particularly Malin Åkerman and Joe Manganiello, though criticizing its overly busy script. New York Post labeled it a "stream it" option, describing The Sleepover as "light, likable, and lively," especially suitable for a younger demographic looking for fast-paced, comedic action.

Common Sense Media praised the film’s family-friendly nature, giving it 3 out of 5 stars and noting its emphasis on teamwork and courage, though it pointed out the presence of mild violence and unrealistic situations. Punch Drunk Critics highlighted its nostalgic vibe, calling it a "good-natured family spy comedy" reminiscent of 1980s adventure films like Adventures in Babysitting (1987), despite familiar tropes and a predictable storyline.
