= Necessary Roughness (TV series) =

2011 American drama television series

- Necessary Roughness original intertitle
- Genre: Drama
- Created by: Liz Kruger; Craig Shapiro
- Starring: Callie Thorne; Marc Blucas; Scott Cohen; Hannah Marks; Patrick Johnson; Mehcad Brooks; Karissa Lee Staples; John Stamos
- Country of origin: United States
- Original language: English
- No. of seasons: 3
- No. of episodes: 38 (list of episodes)

Production
- Executive producers: Jeffrey Lieber; Liz Kruger; Craig Shapiro; Kevin Dowling
- Producers: Donna Dannenfelser; Joe Sabatino
- Editors: Debra Weinfeld; Briana London
- Production companies: Still Married Productions; Universal Cable Productions; Sony Pictures Television

Original release
- Network: USA Network
- Release: June 29, 2011 – August 21, 2013

Necessary Roughness is an American drama television series starring Callie Thorne and Scott Cohen that aired on USA Network from June 29, 2011, to August 21, 2013. The second season premiered on June 6, 2012. The one-hour drama series was picked up for 12 episodes on January 19, 2011. On January 7, 2013, USA Network announced the series was renewed for a 10-episode third season, which began on June 12, 2013. On November 19, 2013, USA canceled the series after three seasons.

== Cast and characters ==
=== Main ===
- Callie Thorne as Dr. Danielle "Dani" Santino (née Romano): The protagonist. Dr. Dani Santino is a tough divorcée who, to make ends meet, becomes the therapist for a professional football team and quickly becomes sought after by other athletes, musicians, politicians and those living in the spotlight. Starting season three she works for V3, a major talent agency in NYC, after being fired by the new GM/head coach of the New York Hawks.
- Marc Blucas as Matthew "Matt" Donnally (seasons 1–2): The New York Hawks' athletic trainer, and later general manager, to whom Dani was attracted.
- Scott Cohen as Dominic Eugene "Nico" Careles: A former Navy SEAL from Pittsburgh, head of security and "fixer" for first the Hawks and then V3.
- Hannah Marks as Lindsay Santino (seasons 1–2, guest season 3): Dani's rebellious teenage daughter.
- Patrick Johnson as Ray "Ray Jay" Santino Jr. (seasons 1–2): Dani's teenage son who is an avid fan of T.K., often using him to get things from the Hawks' team that regular fans could not.
- Mehcad Brooks as Terrence "T.K." King: The New Jersey Bobcats' star player, formerly the New York Hawks' star player and Dani's main focus when she was originally hired by the NY Hawks football team.
- Karissa Lee Staples as Paloma Madsen (season 3): Dani's ambitious new assistant.
- John Stamos as Connor McClane (season 3): the founder of a sports and entertainment management empire named V3, who employs Dani.

=== Recurring ===
- Gregory Alan Williams as Coach Pat Purnell: The former head coach of the New York Hawks, now again TK's coach with the New Jersey Bobcats.
- Andrea Anders as Laura Radcliffe: A high-powered publicist hired by the Hawks to improve T.K.'s public image. She has also had a previous relationship with Matt Donnally.
- Amanda Detmer as Jeanette Fiero: Dani's best friend.
- Jason Gedrick as Dr. J. D. Aldridge: Dani's former grad school professor.
- Evan Handler as Marshall Pittman: Deceased former owner of the New York Hawks.
- Jaime Lee Kirchner as Vivica Stevens: A reporter who T.K. begins dating, but who later is dumped by T.K. after he is shot.
- Concetta Tomei as Angela: Dani's mother, and a gambler.
- Gaius Charles as Damon Razor/Bryce Abbot: An academic football player with a shady past who comes in as a runner-up for T.K. after he is shot.
- Rob Estes as Rob Maroney: T.K.'s agent who helped T.K. on his downward spiral after dealing with being shot.
- Michaela McManus as Noelle Saris: A reporter in behind Terrence King and Damon Razor, searching for Razor's past and threatening a sexual harassment suit on the team and T.K.
- Michael O'Neill as Hank Hooper: A friend of Coach Purnell, who was appointed by the league to be the Interim GM until the "Pittman situation" was resolved.
- Danielle Panabaker as Juliette Pittman: Daughter of Marshall Pittman, briefly owner of the Hawks.
- Travis Smith as Rex Evans: A gay player for the Hawks and Dani's patient, who became friends with T.K. when the star quarterback helped him come out to the team and to the rest of the world.
- David Andrews as Coach Tom Wizinski: The new head coach and GM for the Hawks.
- David Anders as Troy Cutler: Connor's second-in-command at V3.
- Kate Miner as Sheera Kane, a top model who was dating T.K., looking to start a lingerie line with him, and was briefly engaged to him.
- Nicholas X. Parsons as Stanzi Palmer, a computer hacker hired by V3 to assist Nico in collecting intelligence.
- Autumn Reeser as Abby Bruce, girlfriend of Connor.
- Mario Cimarro as Augusto, Spanish chef who returns incognito to help Dr. Dani surprise Jeanette.
- Ben Winchell as Eric

== Episodes ==
| Season | Timeslot (ET) | # Ep. | Premiered | | Ended | | TV Season | Viewers (in millions) |
| Season | Timeslot (ET) | # Ep. | Date | Premiere Viewers (in millions) | Date | Finale Viewers (in millions) | TV Season | Viewers (in millions) |
|---|---|---|---|---|---|---|---|---|
| 1 | Wednesday 10:00 p.m. | 12 | June 29, 2011 | 4.67 | September 14, 2011 | 4.01 | 2011 | 5.85 |
| 2 | Wednesday 10:00 p.m. | 16 | June 6, 2012 | 3.01 | February 20, 2013 | 1.98 | 2012–2013 | 2.50 |
| 3 | Wednesday 10:00 p.m. | 10 | June 12, 2013 | 2.61 | August 21, 2013 | 2.36 | 2013 | 2.19 |

== Development and production ==
The series is based on the true story of a female psychologist Dr. Donna Dannenfelser who worked for the New York Jets. Initially titled Dr. Donna, the show first appeared on the USA Network's development slate in December 2009. In May 2010, the network placed a cast-contingent pilot order under the new name Necessary Roughness. Liz Kruger and Craig Shapiro wrote the pilot script, and Kevin Dowling was set to direct the pilot.

Casting announcements began in mid-September. First to be cast was Callie Thorne, who plays the lead role as Danielle "Dani" Santino. Next to join the project was Marc Blucas, who was cast as the football team's athletic trainer and a romantic interest for Danielle. Scott Cohen and Mehcad Brooks came on board in October. Cohen portrays a football team colleague of Dani's, and Brooks is one of her clients.

Cast as guest stars were Amanda Detmer, as Dani's best friend, Jeanette, and Concetta Tomei, who portrays Dani's mother. In early November, Craig Bierko was added to the cast as Dani's estranged husband.

The pilot episode was filmed in Atlanta, Georgia in November and December 2010, with the Georgia Dome being used for exterior and some interior shots of game day scenes. The network greenlighted the series on January 19, 2011. The series was renewed for a second season by USA Network on September 15, 2011. The series was renewed for a third 10-episode season by USA Networks on January 7, 2013

On June 19, 2013, USA Network announced it will debut a webisode series, called TK Gets Real, that will feature Terrance "TK" King (Mehcad Brooks) as he seeks to become a reality star. The web series will last six weeks. The Real Housewives of Atlanta star Shereé Whitfield will appear in the web series alongside Brooks and new cast member Karissa Lee Staples.

== Home media ==
Universal Studios Home Entertainment released all 3 seasons on DVD in Region 1 between 2012-2014. On July 1, 2016, it was announced that Mill Creek Entertainment has acquired the rights to the series in Region 1 and rereleased all 3 seasons on September 6.

== Awards and accolades ==
Awards and accolades for Necessary Roughness
| Year | Award | Category | Recipient(s) | Result | Refs |
|---|---|---|---|---|---|
| 2012 | Golden Globe Award | Best Performance by an Actress in a Television Series – Drama | Callie Thorne | Nominated | |
| 2013 | Young Artist Awards | Best Performance in a TV Series - Leading Young Actor | Patrick Johnson | Nominated | |
