= Patrick Johnson (actor) =

American actor (born 1993)

- Born: February 19, 1993 (age 33); Orlando, Florida, U.S.
- Occupation: Actor
- Years active: 2007–present
- Spouse: Taylor Green Johnson

Patrick Johnson (born February 19, 1993) is an American actor, known for playing "Ray 'Ray J' Santino Jr." in Necessary Roughness.

Born in Orlando, Florida, Johnson is the fifth of six children. He lives in Nashville, Tennessee. He and three of his siblings were signed to their first agent in Nashville. Within three weeks, he was out on his first audition and booked the job.

== Filmography ==
=== Film ===
Year	T	Role	Notes
2007	Master	Darren	Short film
2009	Digital Diary: Robby	Robby	Video short film
2011	Giggity	Simon	Short film
2011	Parallax	Kidnapper	Short film
2014	Endless Love	Chris Butterfield	
2014	Sabotage	Jacob Wharton	
2015	Project Almanac	Todd	
2016	Maximum Ride	Fang	
2016	Bus Driver	Paul	
2017	County Line	Nat	
2017	Baker's Man	Doug	
2017	All Saints	Father Jeffers	

=== Television ===
Year	Title	Role	Notes
2010	Christmas Cupid	Brad	Television film
2011	Mean Girls 2	Nick "Big Z" Zimmer	Television film
2011–2013	Necessary Roughness	Ray Santino Jr.	25 episodes
2013	Revolution	Teen Bass	Episode: "Home"
2015	Meet My Valentine	Hanson Carter	Television film
2015	Extant	Lucas	5 episodes
2015	Finding Carter	Ned	Episode: "The Consequences of Longing"
2016	The Perfect Daughter	Hanson Carter	Television film
2018	Kidding	Utility Puppeteer / Maestro Puppeteer	2 episodes
2019	Scream: Resurrection	Avery Collins	Episode: "The Deadfast Club"

== Accolades ==
Year	Award	Category	Work	Result	Ref.
2013	Young Artist Award	Best Performance in a TV Series - Leading Young Actor	Necessary Roughness	Nominated	
