= Turtles All the Way Down (film) =

2024 American film by Hannah Marks

- Promotional release poster
- Directed by: Hannah Marks
- Screenplay by: Elizabeth Berger; Isaac Aptaker
- Based on: Turtles All the Way Down by John Green
- Produced by: Wyck Godfrey; Marty Bowen; Isaac Klausner
- Starring: Isabela Merced; Cree; Felix Mallard; Maliq Johnson; Poorna Jagannathan; Judy Reyes; J. Smith-Cameron
- Cinematography: Brian Burgoyne
- Edited by: Andrea Bottigliero
- Music by: Ian Hultquist
- Production companies: New Line Cinema; Temple Hill Entertainment; Rojas Green Production
- Distributed by: Warner Bros. Pictures
- Release date: May 2, 2024
- Running time: 111 minutes
- Country: United States
- Language: English

Turtles All the Way Down is a 2024 American romantic drama film based on the 2017 novel of the same name by John Green. The film is directed by Hannah Marks and stars Isabela Merced, Cree, Felix Mallard, Maliq Johnson, Poorna Jagannathan, Judy Reyes, and J. Smith-Cameron. The story centers on a 16-year-old with obsessive–compulsive disorder who pursues the disappearance of a billionaire.

The project began development at Fox 2000 Pictures in December 2017, with Berger and Aptaker announced as screenwriters and Marks set to direct it in January 2019. Because the Walt Disney Company acquired 21st Century Fox, the parent company of Fox 2000 Pictures, Disney closed Fox 2000 and put the project into turnaround, until it was eventually acquired by New Line Cinema. Merced, who had starred in another adaptation of Green's work, Let It Snow (2019), was announced in March 2022. Principal photography began in April of the same year in Cincinnati and ended in June.

Turtles All the Way Down was released on May 2, 2024, on the streaming service Max.

== Premise ==
When a sixteen-year-old struggling with obsessive–compulsive disorder reconnects with her childhood crush, she confronts the possibility of finding love and happiness in the face of mental illness.

== Cast ==
- Isabela Merced as Aza Holmes
- Cree as Daisy
- Felix Mallard as Davis
- Maliq Johnson as Mychal
- Poorna Jagannathan as Dr. Kira Singh
- Judy Reyes as Gina
- J. Smith-Cameron as Professor Abbott
- Hannah Marks as Holly
- Debby Ryan as Quinn
- John Green as Mr. Adler
- Jason Kientz as Mark Holmes

== Production ==
Turtles All the Way Down was optioned by Fox 2000 Pictures upon the publication of the novel in 2017, with John Green and Rosianna Halse Rojas as executive producers. Elizabeth Berger and Isaac Aptaker were announced as screenwriters in May 2018 and Hannah Marks was announced as director in January 2019. After The Walt Disney Company acquired and subsequently closed Fox 2000 Pictures, the project was put into turnaround until it was eventually acquired by New Line Cinema with distribution rights later passing to the streaming service HBO Max, which would subsequently be replaced by Max (only to return to HBO Max in 2025). The film is also produced by Marty Bowen, Wyck Godfrey, and Isaac Klausner of Temple Hill Entertainment which also produced screen adaptations of Green's previous novels.

Isabela Merced, who had previously starred in another adaptation of Green's work, Let It Snow (2019), was announced in March 2022, and Judy Reyes, Cree Cicchino, Felix Mallard, J. Smith-Cameron, Poorna Jagannathan, and Maliq Johnson were announced as part of the cast in the following months.

Principal photography began in Cincinnati, Ohio, on April 26, 2022, and ended in June.

In January 2024, it was announced that the film would have a "First Look" at the Savannah College of Art and Design's SCAD TVfest in Atlanta on February 9, 2024.

== Release ==
Turtles All the Way Down was released on Max on May 2, 2024.

== Reception ==
On the review aggregator website Rotten Tomatoes, 86% of 28 critics' reviews are positive, with an average rating of 6.6/10. The website's consensus reads: "John Green once again nails the intricacies of adolescence and the importance of mental health in Turtles All the Way Down, a dynamic drama held together by a stellar cast." Metacritic, which uses a weighted average, assigned the film a score of 64 out of 100, based on 9 critics, indicating "generally favorable" reviews.

Adrian Horton of The Guardian awarded the movie three stars out of five and wrote that it "struggles to find a balance between relatable teenage angst and heightened vessel for emotions that feel bigger than life", but complimented the depiction of thought spirals from obsessive compulsive disorder and Merced's performance. Peyton Robinson of RogerEbert.com called it a "charming, delightful YA romance that doesn't bind itself to the sole enjoyment of its target market" while adding that the film will "find the youth identifying and everyone else remembering". Owen Gleiberman of Variety denoted that the film "isn't badly done, yet the film is as reassuringly formulaic in its use of OCD". Gilberman added that Merced "invests with a forlorn agitation that's convincing enough, but never too messy" while Cree gives the most authentic performance as Daisy, whose role in the film, resulting in hitting "a note of something genuine and even a touch daring: the self-centeredness that can result from dealing with a mental disorder".

Lovia Gyarkye of The Hollywood Reporter said that "we don't get to experience even more of Aza and Daisy, whose conversations capture many of the lessons Turtles All the Way Down has to offer". Kate Erbland of IndieWire complimented Marks's ability of adapting the novel, the performance of Merced, Mallard and Cree as well as the soundtrack. Belen Edwards of Mashable considered the dynamic between Aza and Daisy as the "real love story" where Merced and Cree "have sweet chemistry" where the latter's "enjoyably boisterous energy" served as the perfect counterpart for the former's "more toned-down turn". Sarah Hunter Simanson of HuffPost called it a "moving, accurate portrayal of what it feels like to live with a mental illness". Shaina Weatherhead of Collider considered Merced's performance as Aza as one of the "most impressive of her career" while adding that Marks's "vibrant direction makes for a fun and endearing watch".

Natalia Winkelman of The New York Times added that the film's "ambling, novelistic rhythms might have passed muster had the movie filled its empty spaces with strongly delineated characters" but what the film "does offer in surplus is texture, thanks to Marks's springy, stylish direction". Autumn Wright of Paste wrote "the acting, direction, editing, set design and costuming are all done well enough" but felt these elements adding up to something does not feel subversive, rather than being "vaguely aware of itself". Rachel Labonte of Screen Rant wrote that the "narrative shortcomings are ultimately easy to overlook" while further adding that a "more well-rounded cast of characters might've led to a more satisfying viewing experience" but still it had "something worthwhile to say."

== Accolades ==
Awards	Date of ceremony	Category	Recipient(s) and nominee(s)	Result	Ref.
Astra TV Awards	December 8, 2024	Best TV Movie	Turtles All the Way Down	Nominated	
Imagen Awards	September 8, 2024	Best Special or TV Movie	Turtles All the Way Down	Nominated	
Imagen Awards	September 8, 2024	Best Actress – Drama (Television)	Isabela Merced	Nominated	
Imagen Awards	September 8, 2024	Best Supporting Actress – Drama (Television)	Cree	Won	
