= Maliq Johnson =

American actor (born 2000)

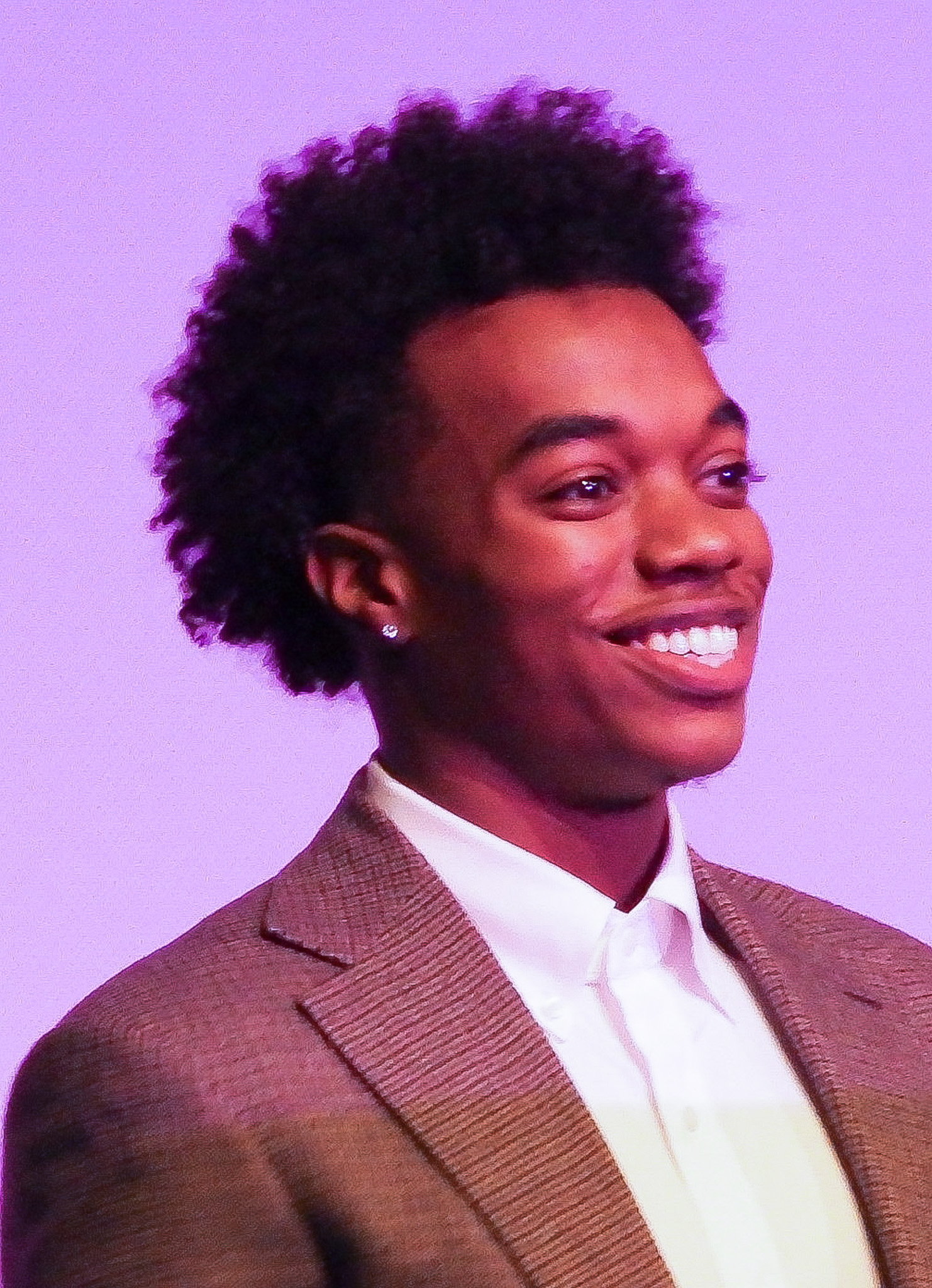
- Johnson in 2025
- Born: Maliq Akil Johnson; June 22, 2000 (age 26); Brooklyn, New York, U.S.
- Occupations: Actor; Model; Dancer
- Years active: 2013−present

Maliq Akil Johnson (born June 22, 2000) is an American actor. On television, he is known for his role in the Netflix series Grand Army (2020). His films include Knucklehead (2015), Little Men, Little Boxes (both 2016), Turtles All the Way Down (2024) and Ricky (2025).

== Early life ==
Johnson was born in Brooklyn, his first home in Starrett City, to Mark Johnson and Tracy Stith. He grew up in the Bedford–Stuyvesant area where his father co-owned Head Hunter Barbershop from 1996 until its closure in 2015 due to gentrification.

Maliq attended Cobble Hill School of American Studies. His first television appearance was in a 2004 PediaSure commercial. He appeared in catalogues and adverts with gigs such as Verizon, GAP, Target, Pillsbury, Zulily, UFT, Macy's, Sean John, Aéropostale, and Kohl's. He took acting classes with Opening Act. He is now based in Queens.

== Filmography ==
Year	Title	Role	Notes
2013	Golden Boy	Joey Olsen	Episode: "Longshot"
2013	...And She Was My Eve	Young Vic	Short film
2015	Knucklehead	Iron Mike	
2015	Show Me a Hero	Norma's Nephew	Miniseries; 1 episode
2016	Little Men	Umar	
2016	Little Boxes	William	
2018	Power	Kid	Episode: "A Friend of the Family"
2019	When They See Us	Terence	Miniseries; 2 episodes
2020	Grand Army	Jayson Jackson	Main role
2024	Turtles All the Way Down	Mychal Turner	
2025	Ricky	James	Post-production
