= Luisa Leschin =

American actress, screenwriter and television producer

- Born: Louisa Josefina Gomez; July 13, 1953 (age 72); Hollywood, Los Angeles, California U.S.
- Occupations: Actress, TV producer, voice-over artist
- Years active: 1978–present
- Spouse: Max Civon (?-present)
- Website: www.luisaleschin.com

Luisa Leschin (born Louisa Josefina Gomez, July 13, 1953) is an American television producer, actress, and voice-over artist. She currently serves as co-executive producer for the Amazon Studios TV series Just Add Magic. In 2019, she won a Norman Lear Writer's Award at the 34th annual Imagen Awards.

== Early life ==
Leschin was born in Hollywood and grew up in Guatemala, where Spanish was her native tongue. Leschin's mother was a concert pianist and her father was a former President of El Salvador. At age five, she made her debut as a dancer, and at the age of eight, she left Guatemala to spend her teenage years in Europe, where she learned to speak French and Italian. After her return to America, she studied at the High School of Performing Arts in New York City, where she majored in ballet.

At age 19, she went to Geneva, Switzerland, to participate in the Grand Théâtre de Genève ballet company.

== Career ==
Leschin returned to America and began acting in television films and series in 1979 with the series The White Shadow. After this, she appeared in multiple series including Square One Television (1987–1992), Beverly Hills, 90210 (1990–1991) and Melrose Place (1995–1997).

Leschin is also active as a screenwriter and producer; she has written and produced episodes for such TV series as George Lopez, Austin & Ally and Everybody Hates Chris.

== Awards and recognitions ==
Year	Result	Award	Category	For	Notes
2006	Nominated	ALMA Awards	Outstanding Script for a Television Drama or Comedy	George Lopez	For episode "George Discovers Benny's Sili-Con Job"
2002	Nominated	ALMA Awards	Outstanding Script for a Television Drama or Comedy	Resurrection Blvd.	Shared with Dennis E. Leoni for episode "Compadres"
