= Hannah Marks =

American actress, writer, and director

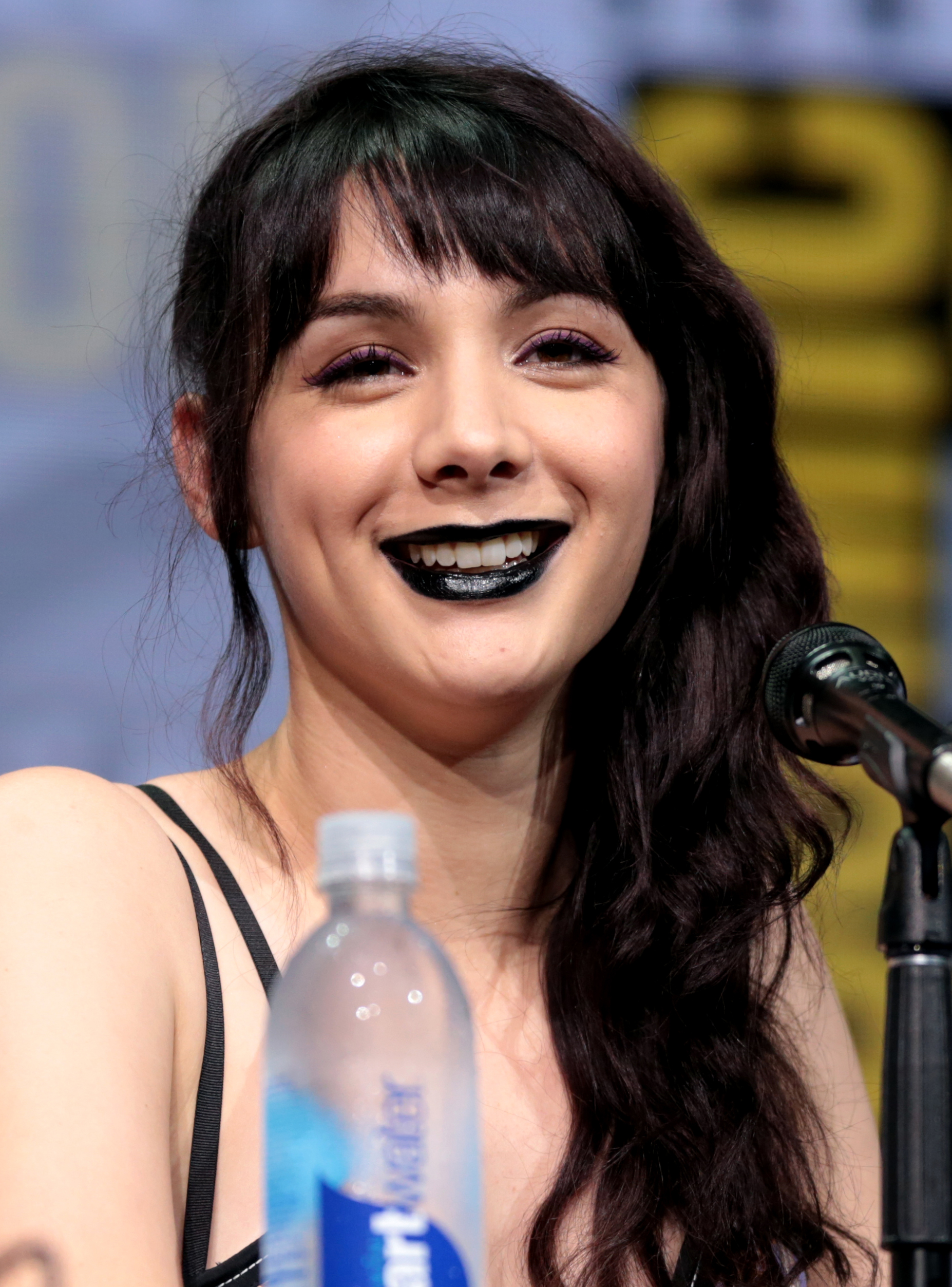
- Marks at the 2017 San Diego Comic-Con
- Born: April 13, 1993 (age 33); Los Angeles, California, U.S.
- Occupations: Actress; filmmaker
- Years active: 2005–present
- Relatives: Ernie Ball (maternal grandfather); Ernest Ball (maternal great-great grandfather)
- Website: hannahmarks.com

Signature
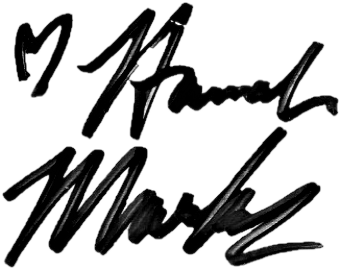

Hannah Marks (born April 13, 1993) is an American actress and filmmaker. She is best known for directing the films After Everything (2018), Don't Make Me Go (2022), and Turtles All the Way Down (2024); as well as co-starring and executive producing the cult hit Dinner in America (2020). She also played Amanda Brotzman on the television series Dirk Gently's Holistic Detective Agency (2016–2017).

== Early life ==
Hannah Marks was born in Los Angeles, the daughter of Robin Marks and Nova Ball, a former actress, and grew up in San Luis Obispo, California. Hannah's maternal grandfather was entrepreneur and musician Ernie Ball, and one of her maternal great-great-grandfathers was composer Ernest Ball.

== Career ==
Marks appeared in the 2006 feature film Accepted as Lizzie Gaines. She has guest-starred in television shows such as Ugly Betty and Weeds. She was featured in the cover story of the June 4, 2006, issue of The New York Times Magazine with her friend Liana Liberato.

Marks played Tammy in The Runaways, a 2010 biographical film about the 1970s all-girl rock band of the same name. She has been nominated twice for a Young Artist Award, first for her performance in the film Accepted, and again for her performance in the television series FlashForward.

Marks starred as Amanda Brotzman in the 2016 BBC America original series Dirk Gently's Holistic Detective Agency. In July 2017, she was named one of Rolling Stone's 25 Under 25 Artists Changing the World.

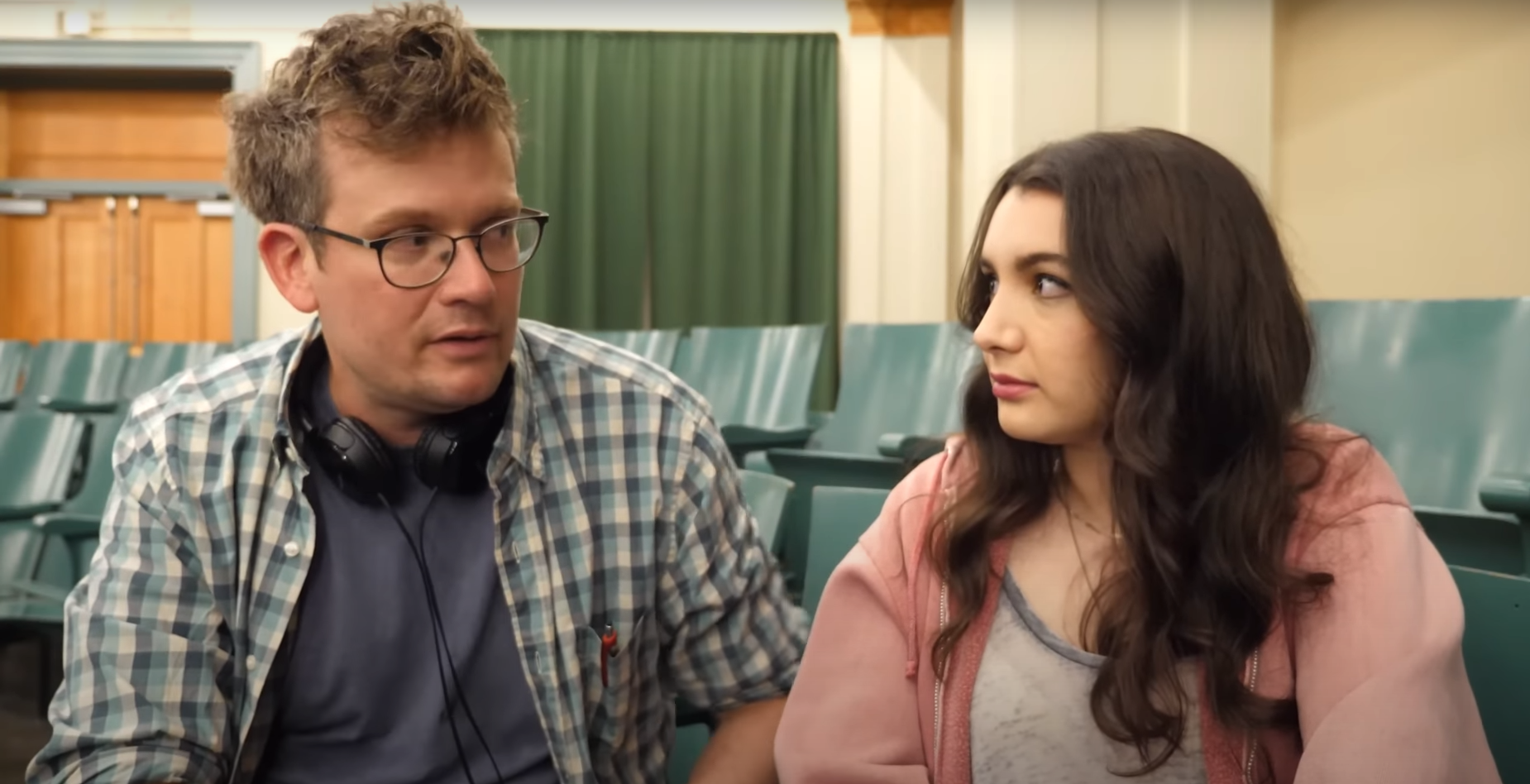
Marks with John Green in a YouTube video about Turtles All the Way Down

In January 2019, Marks was named as the director for an upcoming film adaptation of the John Green novel Turtles All the Way Down. This adaptation was released on May 2, 2024, on the streaming service Max. In March 2021, she was named as the director for the Amazon Studios film Don't Make Me Go starring John Cho.

In September 2026, it was announced that Marks was writing a draft of the screenplay of Gremlins 3 alongside Chris Columbus, who is set to direct and currently scheduled for an October 6, 2028 release.

== Filmography ==
=== Film ===
Year	Title	Role	Notes
2005	Doll Graveyard	Sophia	Direct-to-video
2006	Danika	Lizzie Geralds	Direct-to-video
2006	Accepted	Lizzie Gaines	
2010	The Runaways	Tammy	
2012	The Amazing Spider-Man	Missy Kallenback	
2014	1000 to 1: The Cory Weissman Story	Jess Evans	
2015	Anesthesia	Ella Zarrow	
2015	Southbound	Ava	Segment: "Siren"
2015	Punk's Dead	Penny	
2016	Hard Sell	Lake	
2018	After Everything	—N/a	Director and writer
2018	Banana Split	April	Also writer
2019	Daniel Isn't Real	Sophie	
2020	Dinner in America	Beth	Also executive producer
2020	I Used to Go Here	April	
2021	Mark, Mary & Some Other People	—N/a	Director, writer, and producer
2022	Don't Make Me Go	Tessa	Also director
2024	Turtles All the Way Down	Holly	Also director
2026	The Housewife	Carolyn	
2028	Gremlins 3 †	—N/a	Writer
TBA	Eloise †	—N/a	Writer

=== Television ===
Year	Title	Role	Notes
2005	Numbers	Libby Lamberg	Episode: "In Plain Sight"
2006	Criminal Minds	Dalia Nadir	Episode: "Secrets and Lies"
2007	The Winner	Tracy	Episode: "What Happens in Albany, Stays in Albany"
2007	Heartland	Lesley Walker	Episode: "Pilot"
2007	Private Practice	Ruby	Episode: "In Which Addison Finds a Showerhead"
2008	Ugly Betty	Taylor	Episode: "Zero Worship"
2008–2009	Weeds	Harmony	7 episodes
2010	Hank	Taylor Kelly	Episode: "Hank's Got a Friend"
2010	FlashForward	Annabelle Campos	3 episodes
2010	Saving Grace	Mae Rodriguez	Episode: "I Killed Kristin"
2011–2013	Necessary Roughness	Lindsay Santino	Main role (seasons 1–2); guest role (season 3)
2012	Grimm	Gracie	Episode: "Organ Grinder"
2013	The Client List	Kim	2 episodes
2013	Kristin's Christmas Past	Kristin Cartwell (age 17)	Television film
2014	Castle	Jordan Gibbs	Episode: "Smells Like Teen Spirit"
2014	Awkward	Gloria	Recurring role (season 4)
2014	Law & Order: Special Victims Unit	Evie Barnes	Episode: "Pornstar's Requiem"
2015	The Following	Marisol Masters	Episode: "Home"
2016–2017	Dirk Gently's Holistic Detective Agency	Amanda Brotzman	Main role
2016	The Real O'Neals	Mimi Waxberg	Recurring role
2019	You're the Worst	Mariah	3 episodes
