= Luke Snellin =

English screenwriter and director

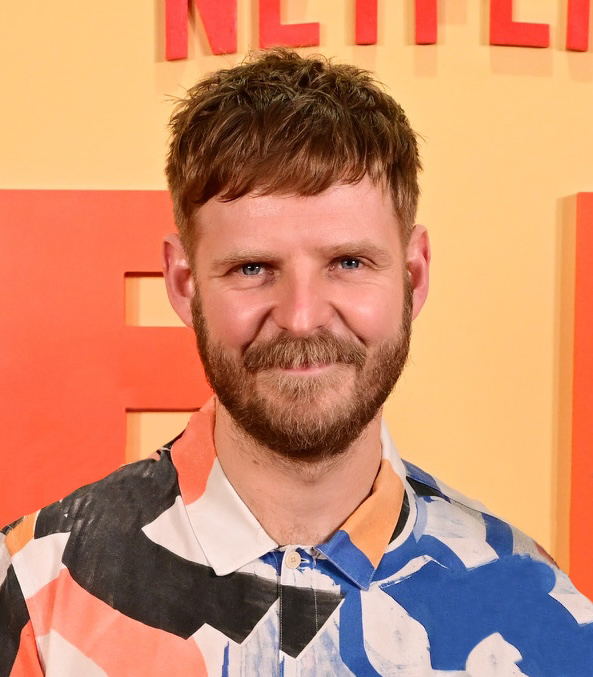
- Snellin at the premiere of the Netflix series 'One Day'.
- Born: 9 March 1986 (age 40)
- Occupations: Film/TV Director & Screenwriter
- Website: lukesnellin.com

Luke Snellin (born 9 March 1986) is a British film and television director and screenwriter.

He was nominated for a BAFTA Film Award in 2010 and named as one of Screen International's "Stars of Tomorrow" in 2010 and one of Broadcast Magazine's "Hot Shots" in 2013.

== Early life and education ==
Snellin attended Coopers Company and Coborn School in Upminster, Essex, before studying screenwriting at Bournemouth University.

== Career ==
His short film Mixtape starring Bill Milner was nominated for a BAFTA for Best Short Film and won the Virgin Media Shorts competition. The film features music from The Kinks and Heart.

Jason Solomons singled out the film in his Trailer Trash column for The Guardian in the build up to the BAFTA Awards in 2010. He stated that he was "Immediately charmed by its retro story of a boy who makes a cassette of songs for the girl next door".

He was then selected as one of seven directors, from nearly a thousand applicants, to direct an episode of original drama for Channel 4 through the broadcaster's "Coming Up" scheme in 2013.

This led to him directing episodes of BAFTA and Emmy-nominated My Mad Fat Diary, Russell T Davies' Banana and Pete Bowker's The A Word.

In 2018/19 he was the lead director on both BBC/Netflix coproduction Wanderlust, written by Nick Payne and starring Toni Collette and Temple, written by Mark O'Rowe and starring Mark Strong.

On Temple, Jeff Robson wrote for The i that "director Luke Snellin creates a suitably surreal atmosphere from the landscape of tunnels, staircases and side doors that Tube travellers glimpse out of the corners of their eyes every day." and Alastair McKay compared it to "at times, like early Tarantino" for The Evening Standard.

Snellin directed the feature film adaptation of John Green, Lauren Myracle and Maureen Johnson's young adult novel, Let It Snow, released by Netflix on 8 November 2019. The film scored an 85% percent fresh rating on Rotten Tomatoes and stars Isabela Merced, Shamiek Moore, Odeya Rush, Kiernan Shipka and Joan Cusack. Let It Snow was nominated for a GLAAD award in 2020. On Let It Snow Adam Chitwood wrote for Collider that “Luke Snellin makes his feature directorial debut with a warm, cinematic approach to the material, crafting a dynamic frame so that the film is visually engaging...it’s a treat to watch a Christmas movie that feels genuinely cinematic.”. While The New York Times' Elisabeth Vincentelli said “this fat-free, affectionate debut feature from director Luke Snellin embodies the Christmas spirit of tolerance and generosity — spiced up with some genuinely funny scenes.”

In 2021 he directed the entirety of the second season of Feel Good starring Mae Martin, Charlotte Ritchie and Lisa Kudrow for which he won an RTS Award for Best Director - Comedy Drama at the RTS Craft and Design Awards. The show also won an NME Award for Best TV Show and was ranked at number 6 on The Guardian's 50 Best TV Shows of 2021.

He directed episodes 10-13 of Netflix show One Day created by Nicole Taylor and based on the book of the same name by David Nicholls. Starring Ambika Mod and Leo Woodall, the show debuted to critical and commercial success in February 2024 with The Guardian calling it "a flawless rom com" and ranking it at number 3 on their 50 Best TV Shows of 2024. In March 2025 One Day was nominated for a BAFTA TV Award in the Limited Drama category.

Snellin directed and executive produced all four episodes of Warp Films mini series Reunion which began airing on BBC One on the 7th April 2025 and stars Matthew Gurney, Lara Peake, Anne-Marie Duff, Eddie Marsan and Rose Ayling-Ellis. The show is a bilingual drama written by deaf writer William Mager, featuring both spoken English and British Sign Language and called "groundbreaking" by The Standard and an "absolute revelation" by The Guardian. Snellin began learning British Sign Language in order to direct the show.

He co-founded production company Mixtape Pictures in 2025, named after his early short film Mixtape, alongside his producer Joanna Kay; with a focus on telling contemporary stories from unique points of view.

February 2026 saw the release of HBO show Industry's fourth season with Snellin directing episodes five and six of the series, entitled Eyes Without A Face and Dear Henry, the latter of which was singled out by Indiewire in their Emmy Awards predictions coverage.

The show was met with critical acclaim with The Guardian calling it "truly twisted top tier television" and Variety writing that “Industry Season 4 is a wildly ambitious reinvention that cranks the HBO finance drama up to 11”. On February 25th 2026 HBO announced that they had renewed the show for a fifth and final season.

Deadline announced in March 2026 that Snellin would be directing episodes of Berlin Noir, an Apple TV series created by Peter Straughan, exec produced by Tom Hanks, starring Jack Lowden and Colin Firth and that production was underway in Berlin.

== Personal life ==
He lives in South East London with his wife and two children.

== Filmography ==
Film

- Let it Snow (2019)

Television

| Year | Title | Notes |
|---|---|---|
| 2013 | Coming Up | Season 11 Episode 7 |
| 2014 | My Mad Fat Diary | Season 2 Episodes 3&4 |
| 2014 | Banana | Season 1 Episodes 5&7 |
| 2016 | The A Word | Season 2 Episodes 4-6 |
| 2018 | Wanderlust | Season 1 Episodes 1-3 |
| 2019 | Temple | Season 1 Episodes 1-3 |
| 2021 | Feel Good | Season 2 |
| 2024 | One Day | Season 1 Episodes 10-13 |
| 2025 | Reunion | Season 1 (Also executive producer) |
| 2026 | Industry | Season 4 Episodes 5&6 |
| TBA | Berlin Noir | |

Short film

| Year | Title | Director | Writer | Producer |
|---|---|---|---|---|
| 2016 | First | Yes | Yes | Yes |
| 2011 | Jess//Jim | Yes | Yes | No |
| 2011 | Charlie | Yes | Yes | No |
| 2010 | Disco | Yes | Yes | No |
| 2009 | Mixtape | Yes | Yes | Yes |
| 2008 | Patrick | Yes | Yes | Yes |

== Awards and nominations ==
| Year | Association | Category | Project | Result |
|---|---|---|---|---|
| 2025 | Rose D'or | Drama | Reunion | Nominated |
| 2025 | BAFTA TV Awards | Limited Drama | One Day | Nominated |
| 2021 | RTS Craft and Design Awards | Best Director - Comedy Drama or Situation Comedy | Feel Good | Won |
| 2021 | NME Awards | Best TV Show | Feel Good | Won |
| 2020 | GLAAD Awards | Best Made for TV Movie | Let It Snow | Nominated |
| 2010 | BAFTA Film Awards | Best Short Film | Mixtape | Nominated |
| 2009 | Virgin Media Shorts | Best Short Film | Mixtape | Won |
