= Paula Garfield =

British theatre director and actress

Paula Garfield MBE is a British theatre director and actress. She is Deaf and a British Sign Language user. In 2002 she co-founded the theatre company Deafinitely Theatre.

== Activity ==
Garfield started her career as an actor. As an actress, Garfield has appeared in TV roles such as in Small World, the first sitcom in BSL created by Brian Duffy and Ace Mahbaz, and Casualty, as well as in different productions on stage, for example as Lavinia in Titus Andronicus.

Garfield was often the only deaf member of the cast, and she grew frustrated at the lack of access and possibilities for deaf actors. For this reason, in 2002, along with Steven Webb and Kate Furby she founded the theatre company Deafinitely Theatre, which specialises in productions in British Sign Language, with deaf cast and crews. Deafinitely Theatre has since produced several plays, which include classic repertoire as well as contemporary theatre and original pieces. The plays are performed using a combination of BSL, Visual Vernacular (VV), gesture, facial expression and body language. Sometimes, the production is bilingual, in which a hearing actor plays in parallel and provides voice over to the deaf actor. Deafinitely Theatre provides bursaries for talented deaf actors and writers, as well as workshops.

In May 2012, during the World Shakespeare Festival, as part of a special run where each of Shakespeare's 37 plays were played in a different language, she directed Love's Labour's Lost at Shakespeare's Globe. The cast included Charlotte Arrowsmith, Nadia Nadarajah, Brian Duffy and Donna Mulligans. After two performances at the Globe, the production toured the UK. It was the first play to be performed entirely by deaf actors at the Globe.

Other productions include A Midsummer Night's Dream (at the Globe, 2014), 4.48 Psychosis, Grounded and Contractions (for the latter, she received the 2017 Offie for 'Best Production'). With Rebecca Atkinson, she co-wrote Playing God in 2007. She has also worked for TV channels such as Channel 4 (Learn Sign Language, Four Fingers and a Thumb) and the BBC.

In 2021, Garfield was invited to deliver a TEDx talk at the Royal Central School of Speech and Drama.
