= Let It Snow (disambiguation) =

"Let It Snow! Let It Snow! Let It Snow!" is a popular Christmas song.

Let It Snow may also refer to:

== Film ==
- Let It Snow (2001 film), an American romantic comedy film
- Let It Snow (2019 film), an American romantic comedy based on the 2008 novel (see below)
- Let It Snow (2020 film), a Ukrainian-Georgian horror film
- Love the Coopers (working title Let It Snow), a 2015 American comedy-drama film

== Literature ==
- Let It Snow: Three Holiday Romances, a 2008 novel comprising stories by John Green, Maureen Johnson, and Lauren Myracle
- Let It Snow, a 2019 novel by Nancy Thayer
- Let It Snow, a Toot & Puddle children's book by Holly Hobbie

== Music ==
- Let It Snow: A Holiday Collection, a 2013 album by Jewel
- Let It Snow (EP), a 2003 EP by Michael Bublé
- Let It Snow, a 2017 album by 98 Degrees
- Let It Snow, a 2007 album by Chanticleer
- Let It Snow, a 2004 album by Voices in Public
- "Let It Snow" (song), a 1993 song by Boyz II Men
- Let It Snow, Baby... Let It Reindeer, a 2007 album by Relient K

== Television episodes ==
- "Let It Snow" (ER)
- "Let It Snow" (Night Court)
- "Let It Snow" (Southland)
