= Emilia Holliday =

British actress (born 2010 or 2011)

- Born: 2010 or 2011 (age 15–16); Sheffield, South Yorkshire, England
- Occupations: Actress, singer
- Years active: 2025–present

Emilia Holliday (born 2010 or 2011) is an English actress and singer. She is best known for her role in Adolescence (2025) as Katie Leonard.

== Early life and career ==
Emilia Holliday was born in Sheffield, England. She began acting in musical theatre at the age of three. At 11, Holliday signed with a management agency.

Holliday's first acting role was on the Netflix series Adolescence (2025). She played Katie Leonard during a CCTV footage where her character is murdered in the first episode. Holliday also sang Sting's song, "Fragile", in the background, along with the choir of the school that was filmed in the series, in the second episode, and Aurora's song, "Through the Eyes of a Child", in the final scene. She appeared in Reunion (2025) as young Carly, who is played by Lara Peake.

== Filmography ==
Year	Title	Role	Notes	Ref.
2025	Adolescence	Katie Leonard	Episode 1; also soundtrack	
2025	Reunion	Young Carly	2 episodes	
