= Rose Ayling-Ellis =

British actress (born 1994)

Rose Ayling-Ellis MBE
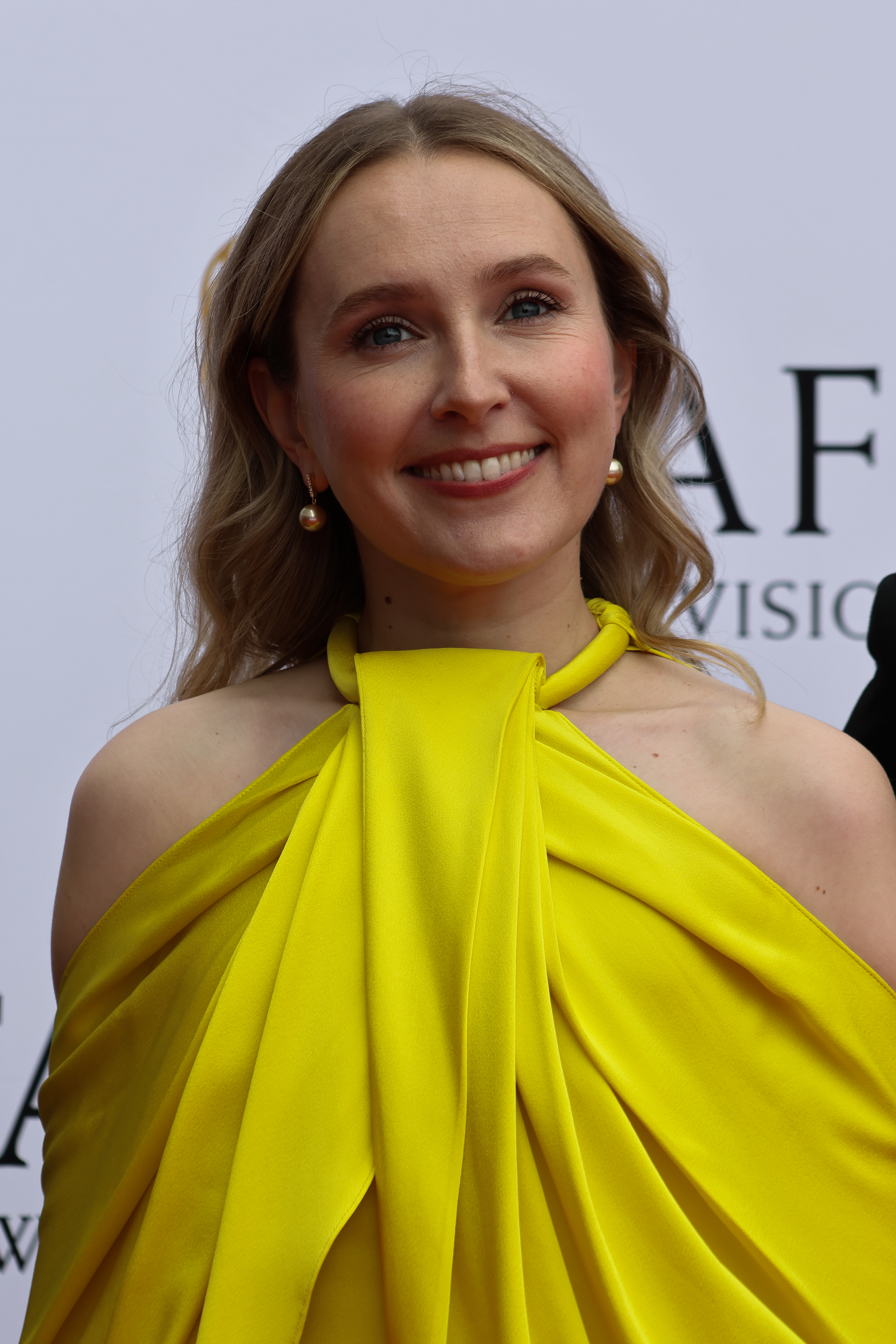
- Ayling-Ellis in 2026
- Born: Rose Lucinda Ayling-Ellis; 17 November 1994 (age 31); Hythe, Kent, England
- Education: University for the Creative Arts
- Occupations: Actress; presenter; writer
- Years active: 2011–present

Rose Lucinda Ayling-Ellis (born 17 November 1994) is a British actress, television presenter and writer of children's books. Deaf since birth, she is a British Sign Language user.

Ayling-Ellis gained recognition as Frankie Lewis in the BBC soap opera EastEnders (2020–2022), and won the nineteenth series of the dancing competition show Strictly Come Dancing with Giovanni Pernice in 2021; she was the programme's first deaf contestant. In 2025, she starred in the drama series Reunion and Code of Silence, earning a nomination for the British Academy Television Award for Best Supporting Actress for Reunion.

Also known for her theatre work, Ayling-Ellis was nominated for a Laurence Olivier Award and won The Stage Debut Award for the play As You Like It (2022–2023). She is the recipient of the Visionary Honours for Inspirational Person of the Year.

== Early life and education ==
Rose Lucinda Ayling-Ellis was born on 17 November 1994, in Hythe, Kent, where she grew up with her older brother. She was born deaf. Her parents separated when she was five months old.

She attended Cheriton primary school from 2000–2006 then Christ Church, Church of England High School in Ashford, Kent. As a child, she took part in a filming weekend organised by the National Deaf Children's Society. During the weekend, she met deaf film director Ted Evans, who later cast her in his 2011 short film The End, which marked her acting debut. She then joined the Deafinitely Youth Theatre, and concurrently studied fashion design at the University for the Creative Arts, graduating in 2016.

== Career ==
=== Acting ===
Following her debut in The End, Ayling-Ellis appeared in a number of stage productions, including Lyric Hammersmith's Herons Workshop in 2016, Royal Exchange Theatre's Mother Courage in 2019, and London National Theatre's Faith, Hope and Charity in 2019. Her early television credits include the medical drama Casualty (2017) and the period drama Summer of Rockets (2019). She also had a part in the 2017 music video for The Vamps' song "Middle of the Night".

From 2020 to 2022, Ayling-Ellis portrayed Frankie Lewis in the BBC soap opera EastEnders. Her character was originally written by deaf journalist and scriptwriter Charlie Swinbourne, and she made her first appearance on 18 May 2020. Her departure from the series was announced in August 2022, with her final scenes airing on 22 September 2022.

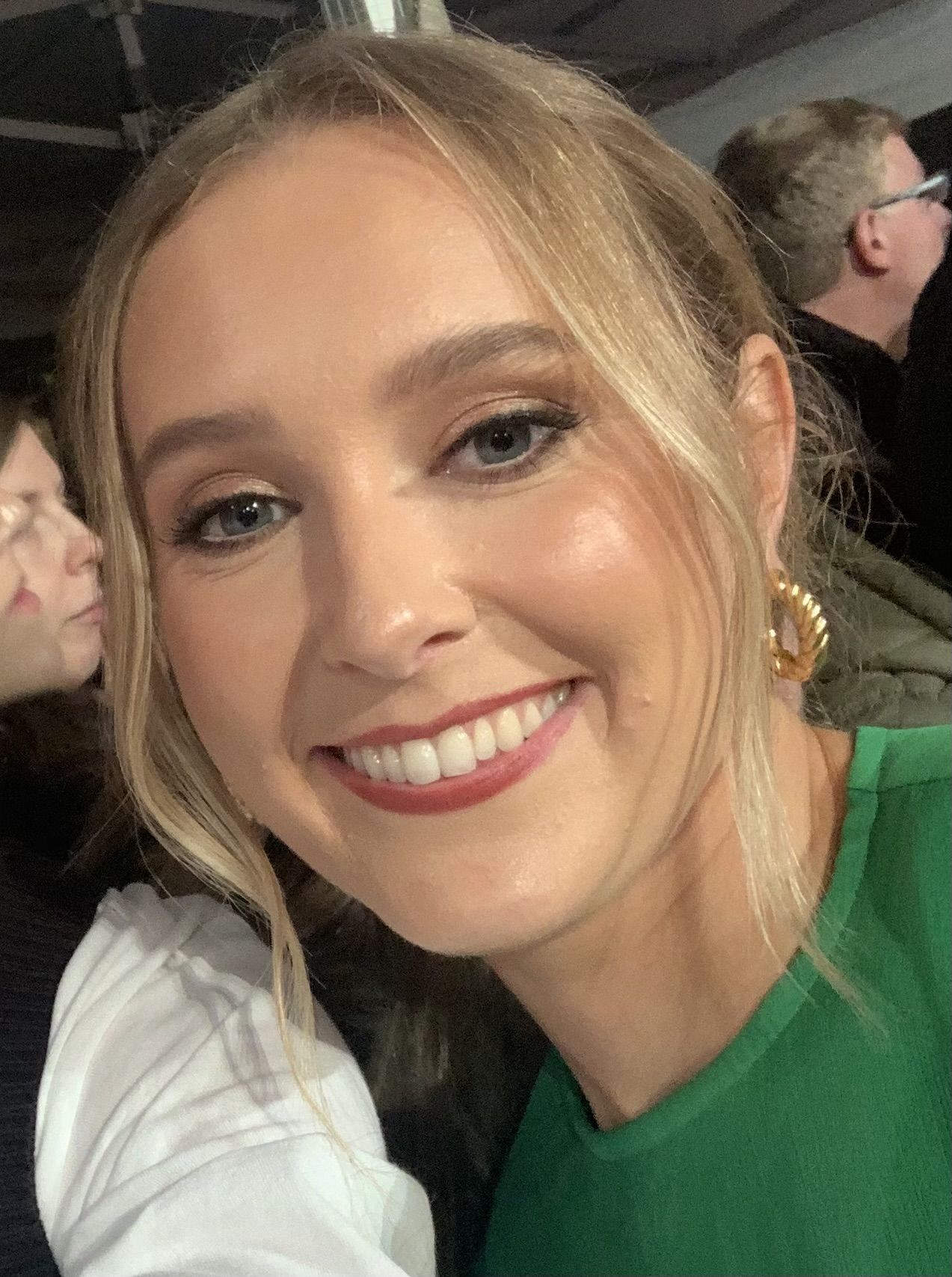
Ayling-Ellis at the 27th National Television Awards in 2022

Ayling-Ellis was nominated for Best Actress in a Supporting Role at the 2023 Laurence Olivier Awards and won The Stage Debut Award for Best West End Debut for her performance in As You Like It at @sohoplace. She starred as Miri in the BBC thriller series Reunion, and appeared in a guest role in "The Well", an episode of the fifteenth series of Doctor Who, both in 2025. Ayling-Ellis also portrayed Alison Brooks in the 2025 ITV drama series Code of Silence. Her performance in Reunion earned her a nomination for the British Academy Television Award for Best Supporting Actress.

=== Other ventures ===
In 2021, Ayling-Ellis became the first deaf contestant on BBC's Strictly Come Dancing. She participated in and won the show's 19th series, with professional Giovanni Pernice. In an interview before the start of the series, she said:

I have a hearing aid, so I pick up some of the music and I can hear the beat. I can hear someone singing, but I can't identify exact words. I also feel the vibrations.

Ayling-Ellis and Pernice scored 40 (full marks) for their tango in week six, which was the earliest "perfect score" in the show's history. In week eight, their Couple's Choice contemporary dance featured a rumba with an added period of silence as a tribute to the deaf community. Described by judge Anton Du Beke as "the greatest thing I've ever seen on the show", it earned them the 2021 Heat Unmissables Award for TV Moment of the Year. It also won the British Academy Television Award for Virgin TV's Must-See Moment in 2022.

Week #	Dance / Song	Judges' scores					Result
Week #	Dance / Song	Horwood	Mabuse	Ballas	Du Beke	Total	Result
1	Jive / "Shake It Off"	6	6	4	6	22	No elimination
2	Salsa / "Cuba"	6	7	6	7	26	Safe
3	Foxtrot / "Rose's Theme"	9	9	9	9	36	Safe
4	Cha-cha-cha / "Raspberry Beret"	7	6	6	7	26	Safe
5	Viennese waltz / "Fallin'"	9	10	9	9	37	Safe
6	Tango / "Shivers"	10	10	10	10	40	Safe
7	Samba / "Cinema Italiano"	8	8	8	8	32	Safe
8	Contemporary / "Symphony"	9	10	10	10	39	Safe
9	Quickstep / "Love Is an Open Door"	10	9	9	10	38	Safe
10	Paso doble / "California Dreamin'"	8	8	8	9	33	Safe
11	American Smooth / "This Will Be"	9	10	10	10	39	Safe
12	Waltz / "How Long Will I Love You?"; Argentine tango / "A Evaristo Carriego"	9; 10	10; 10	10; 10	10; 10	39; 40	Safe
13	Quickstep / "Love Is an Open Door"; Freestyle / "The Rose"; Contemporary / "Symphony"	9; 10; 10	10; 10; 10	10; 10; 10	10; 10; 10	39; 40; 40	Winner

In May 2022, Ayling-Ellis became the first celebrity to sign a bedtime story on CBeebies, telling the tale of Raymond Antrobus's 2020 children's picture book Can Bears Ski?. In August 2022, she unveiled the first deaf Barbie doll equipped with behind-the-ear hearing aids released as part of the Barbie Fashionistas line consisting of a number of diverse dolls. She worked with Mattel during the production of the doll, and featured in the promotional campaign "Rose, Barbie & Friends".

Ayling-Ellis presented the BBC documentary Rose Ayling-Ellis: Signs for Change in 2023, and the two-part BBC documentary series Rose Ayling-Ellis: Old Hands, New Tricks in 2025. In August 2024, she was announced as a presenter for Channel 4's coverage of the 2024 Summer Paralympics in Paris, France. As a result, she became the first deaf person to host live sport coverage on British television.

As announced in June 2024, Ayling-Ellis signed a 10-book deal with DK Children's, including non-fiction, picture books and board books, starting with Rose Knows: The Amazing Story of Communication in 2025.

Ayling-Ellis took part in the 2026 New Year Taskmaster panel game show, winning the second episode and becoming the overall winner.

== Personal life ==
In an interview with the National Deaf Children's Society, Ayling-Ellis explained that she often has to perform using Sign-supported English (SSE) to reflect her own communication style and make it clear to audiences. Her deafness has not stopped her from enjoying music, and she told The Guardian that her favourite artists are Dolly Parton and Stevie Wonder, and that she is a big fan of soul music. She was in a relationship with Samuel Arnold, who is also deaf, from 2014 until 2022.

Ayling-Ellis was appointed Member of the Order of the British Empire (MBE) in the 2024 Birthday Honours for voluntary services to the deaf community. She was the subject of a 2024 episode of the BBC genealogy programme Who Do You Think You Are? On the programme, she discovered that her fourth great-grandfather, Pasquel Lyons, was born in Italy and is likely to have emigrated to the United Kingdom during the Napoleonic Wars.

== Bibliography ==
- Rose Knows: The Amazing Story of Communication (2025)
- Rose Says Good Morning! (2025)
- Rose Says Good Night! (2025)

== Filmography ==
Year	Title	Role	Notes	Ref.
2011	The End	Sophia	Short film	
2015	The Quiet Ones	Charlotte	Short film	
2017	Casualty	Bianca Sinclair	Series 32, episode 7	
2018	Reverberations	Josephine	Short film	
2019	Summer of Rockets	Esther	Main role	
2020	Almost	Sarah	Short film	
2020–2022	EastEnders	Frankie Lewis	Regular role; 131 episodes	
2021	Strictly Come Dancing	Contestant	Series 19	
2022	CBeebies Bedtime Stories	Narrator	Episodes: "Can Bears Ski?" and "Everybody Can Dance"	
2023	Sing for the King: The Search for the Coronation Choir	Mentor	Documentary	
2023	Rose Ayling-Ellis: Signs for Change	Presenter	Documentary	
2023	Shakespeare Sonnets: A Modern Love Story	Narrator	Television special	
2023	Murder, They Hope	Catherine	Episode: "Blood Actually"	
2024	Afternoon Live	Presenter	2024 Summer Paralympics coverage	
2024	Who Do You Think You Are?	Herself	Series 21, episode 4	
2024	Ludwig	Freya Chordwell	Series 1, episode 5	
2025	Rose Ayling-Ellis: Old Hands, New Tricks	Presenter	Documentary series	
2025	Reunion	Miri Mokhtar	Main role	
2025	Doctor Who	Aliss Fenly	Episode: "The Well"	
2025	Code of Silence	Alison Brooks	Main role, also executive producer	
2026	Taskmaster	Herself	Two-part New Year Treat special	
2026	The Great Stand Up to Cancer Bake Off	Herself	Contestant; series nine	
TBA	Tuva	Tuva Moodyson	Upcoming series; also executive producer	

== Stage ==
Year	Title	Role	Notes
2016	Herons Workshop	Michelle	Lyric Hammersmith
2019	Mother Courage	Kattrin	Royal Exchange
2019	Faith, Hope and Charity	Daughter	National Theatre
2019	Peter Pan	Wendy	Birmingham Repertory Theatre
2022	Strictly Come Dancing Live!	Herself	UK tour (various locations)
2022–2023	As You Like It	Celia	@sohoplace

== Awards and nominations ==
Year	Award	Category	Nominee/work	Result	Ref.
2020	Digital Spy Reader Awards	Best Soap Newcomer	EastEnders	Third	
2021	National Television Awards	Newcomer	EastEnders	Nominated	
2021	Heat Unmissables Awards	TV Moment of the Year (with Giovanni Pernice)	Silent Dance on Strictly Come Dancing	Won	
2022	Visionary Honours	Inspirational Person of the Year	Herself	Won	
2022	National Television Awards	Serial Drama Performance	EastEnders	Nominated	
2023	Laurence Olivier Awards	Best Actress in a Supporting Role	As You Like It	Nominated	
2023	The Stage Debut Awards	Best West End Debut	As You Like It	Won	
2024	Grierson Awards	Best Documentary Presenter	Rose Ayling-Ellis: Signs for Change	Nominated	
2025	Royal Television Society Programme Awards	Sports Presenter, Commentator or Pundit (with Clare Balding)	2024 Summer Paralympics	Won	
2025	National Film Awards UK	Best Actress in a TV Series	Code of Silence	Nominated	
2025	National Television Awards	Drama Performance	Code of Silence	Nominated	
2025	TVTimes Awards	Favourite Actor	Code of Silence	Nominated	
2026	TV Choice Awards	Best Drama Performance	Code of Silence	Nominated	
2026	British Academy Television Awards	Best Supporting Actress	Reunion	Nominated	
