= Wanderlust (British TV series) =

British TV drama miniseries

- Genre: Drama
- Created by: Nick Payne
- Written by: Nick Payne
- Directed by: Luke Snellin; Lucy Tcherniak
- Starring: Toni Collette; Steven Mackintosh; Zawe Ashton; William Ash
- Country of origin: United Kingdom
- Original language: English
- No. of series: 1
- No. of episodes: 6

Production
- Executive producers: Roanna Benn; Jude Liknaitzky; Lucy Richer
- Producer: Kate Crowther
- Cinematography: Ben Wheeler
- Editor: Johnny Rayner / Gary Dollner
- Running time: 56 minutes
- Production company: Drama Republic

Original release
- Network: BBC One (UK); Netflix (international)
- Release: 4 September – 9 October 2018

Wanderlust is a six-part British television drama written by Nick Payne and directed by Luke Snellin and Lucy Tcherniak. The series is a co-production between BBC One and Netflix, with BBC One airing the first episode on 4th September 2018 in the United Kingdom, and Netflix streaming the show outside the UK. It began airing on 19th October 2018 on Netflix. The miniseries consists of six episodes.

== Plot ==
Joy Richards, a therapist, is injured in a traffic accident. The accident was caused in part by distraction upon her sighting a former patient of hers, Emily. Emily's husband, Josh (who was also a patient in couples therapy), died by suicide during the treatment. Joy's injuries and her recovery from them exacerbate the marital difficulties she is having with her husband, Alan. Joy meets Marvin at physical therapy, and they have a fling. Alan confesses an affair with a colleague, Claire. Rather than become mutually acrimonious, Joy suggests an open marriage as a solution to their difficulties. Joy's affair with Marvin ends but she rekindles romance with her (now married) former boyfriend Lawrence. Alan detests Lawrence because Joy had cheated on Alan previously with Lawrence. Episode 5 consists mainly of a long session with Joy's own therapist (Angela), during which Joy comes to realize her self-destructive promiscuity is a sublimation to avoid the real issues in her life: bereavement from her mother's death and guilt over the suicide of her patient, Josh.

== Cast ==
- Toni Collette as Joy Richards, a therapist, married to Alan.
- Steven Mackintosh as Alan Richards, an English teacher and Joy's husband.
- Zawe Ashton as Claire Pascal, a fellow English teacher at Alan's school.
- Joe Hurst as Tom Richards, a 16-year-old student and youngest child of Joy and Alan.
- Emma D'Arcy as Naomi Richards, Alan and Joy's 18-year-old daughter.
- Celeste Dring as Laura Richards, Joy and Alan's 25-year-old daughter.
- Royce Pierreson as Jason Hales, a patient of Joy's.
- William Ash as Marvin Walters, a police officer who begins a sexual relationship with Joy.
- Isis Hainsworth as Michelle McCullen, a friend of Tom who is in love with him.
- Jeremy Swift as Neil Bellows, Rita's husband and a neighbour of Joy's.
- Anastasia Hille as Rita Bellows, Joy's neighbour. After her marriage to Neil breaks down, she begins to explore her sexuality with Naomi.
- Sophie Okonedo as Angela Bowden, Joy's therapist.
- Paul Kaye as Lawrence, a former husband of Joy for whom she still has some affection.
- Dylan Edwards as Marc, a young man who Joy dates occasionally.
- Anya Chalotra as Jennifer Ashman, an older pupil at Tom's school.
- Kate O'Flynn as Emily Riley, a former patient of Joy who attended couples therapy with her husband Josh.
- Simon Tcherniak as Josh Riley, Emily's husband who also attended couples therapy and called Joy before committing suicide.
- Megan Richards as Mimi Brooks, a friend of Tom and Michelle.
- Jordan Adene as Sam Morton, also a friend of Tom and Michelle.
- Ashley McGuire as Janet Malherbe

== Reviews ==
The series was described by the Evening Standard as a "meandering polyamory drama".

== Episodes ==
No.	Title	Directed by	Written by	Original release date	U.K. viewers (millions)
1	"Episode 1"	Luke Snellin	Nick Payne	4 September 2018 (UK); 19 October 2018 (U.S.)	4.69 million
2	"Episode 2"	Luke Snellin	Nick Payne	11 September 2018	Less than 3.94 million
3	"Episode 3"	Luke Snellin	Nick Payne	18 September 2018	Less than 4.18 million
4	"Episode 4"	Lucy Tcherniak	Nick Payne	25 September 2018	N/A
5	"Episode 5"	Lucy Tcherniak	Nick Payne	2 October 2018	N/A
6	"Episode 6"	Lucy Tcherniak	Nick Payne	9 October 2018	N/A

== Soundtrack ==
- Recurring: Regulate by Warren G and Nate Dogg
- Episode 5: The Ship Song, written by Nick Cave and performed by Nick Cave and the Bad Seeds
- Episode 6: Song to the Siren performed by This Mortal Coil featuring Elizabeth Fraser and Robin Guthrie. Sour Soul by BadBadNotGood.
- Episode 1:
1. Honey, Let Me Know - MarthaGunn
2. Regulate (feat. Nate Dogg) - Warren G
3. As I Am - Curtis Harding
4. What Would You Do - Joan As Police Woman
5. Heartbeat - Alice Boman
6. Nothing's Gonna Hurt You Baby - Cigarettes After Sex
7. I'm So Sorry - Aldous Harding
8. Home - Joe Goddard
9. (other episodes here:)

At one point Joy visits a club/pub where This Is The Kit are performing the song Magic Spell.
