= The Key to the Golden Firebird =

2004 novel by Maureen Johnson

- Author: Maureen Johnson
- Language: English
- Genre: Young adult
- Published: June 2004 HarperCollins
- Publication place: United States
- Media type: Hardcover
- Pages: 297
- Awards: ALA Best Books for Young Adults, 2005
- ISBN: 9780060541385
- Followed by: The Bermudez Triangle (2006)

The Key to the Golden Firebird is the debut novel by noted young adult author Maureen Johnson. It was first published in 2004, and was listed as a Best Books for Young Adults by the American Library Association in 2005.

== Synopsis ==
Brooks, May and Palmer are three teenage sisters dealing with the sudden death of their father. Brooks and Palmer had shared their father's love of baseball (all three girls are named for baseball players) and are athletic softball players themselves, but May, the middle brainy sister, had always felt left out of that athletic circle.

The novel follows the three sisters as they each work out life without their father (and with mother overwhelmed by her own work and grief). Brooks and Palmer, the athletes, begin to falter at sports, and May begins to wonder about her romantic feelings towards Pete, who has always been in the girls' life like an annoying brother.

The story drives toward the girls' trip to fulfill their father's wish: to scatter his ashes on the pitcher's mound at Camden Yards.

== Reception ==
The Key To The Golden Firebird received moderately positive reviews. Booklist stated that "Johnson's novel will pull readers in with its quietly complex story." "This story is told in the third person, more and more unusual in YA novels, but the despair of May and her sisters is clear, even if not related in the confessional first-person narrative", Kiatt said. Kirkus Reviews complemented Johnson on her "literate, sophisticated style". Kirkus Reviews also mentioned that "her expert character development taps into the real emotions of three fully realized adolescents".
