= Reunion (British TV series) =

British television series

- Genre: Drama
- Screenplay by: William Mager
- Directed by: Luke Snellin
- Starring: Matthew Gurney; Lara Peake; Anne-Marie Duff; Eddie Marsan; Rose Ayling-Ellis
- Theme music composer: Jeremy Warmsley
- Country of origin: United Kingdom
- Original language: English
- No. of series: 1
- No. of episodes: 4

Production
- Executive producers: Mark Herbert; Gwen Gorst; William Mager; Luke Snellin; Rebecca Ferguson; Jo McClellan
- Producer: Helen Ostler
- Running time: 57 minutes
- Production company: Warp Films

Original release
- Network: BBC One
- Release: 7 April – 15 April 2025

Reunion is a British television drama miniseries that aired from 7 to 15 April 2025 on BBC One. The cast is led by Matthew Gurney as Daniel Brennan and includes Lara Peake, Anne-Marie Duff, Eddie Marsan, and Rose Ayling-Ellis. The majority of the cast and the crew on the series are deaf or use British Sign Language.

== Synopsis ==
Daniel Brennan is a deaf man released from prison, ostracised by friends and family, seeking to discover and unravel the events that led to his imprisonment.

== Cast and characters ==
- Matthew Gurney as Daniel Brennan
- Lara Peake as Carly
  - Emilia Holliday as young Carly
- Anne-Marie Duff as Christine
- Eddie Marsan as Stephen
- Rose Ayling-Ellis as Miri
- Stephen Collins as Sean
- Ace Mahbaz as Ray Mokhtar
- Sophie Leigh Stone as Naomi Brennan
- Olive Gray as Anna Shenford
- Joe Sims as Joe Summers
- Julian Peedle-Calloo as Gardner
- Charles Humphreys as Lawrence
- Cherie Gordon as Tasha
- Rinkoo Barpaga as Vinay
- James Joseph Boyle as Matthew
- Sophie Allen as Danni
- Joanne Harrison as Brennan's Mum
- David Hirshman as Brennan's dad.

== Production ==
The four-part series is produced by Warp Films for BBC One and BBC iPlayer. It is created and written by William Mager and directed by Luke Snellin, with Helen Ostler as producer, and Siobhan Morgan as associate producer. Mark Herbert and Gwen Gorst are executive producers for Warp Films, alongside series writer William Mager and series director Luke Snellin, with Rebecca Ferguson and Jo McClellan for the BBC.

The majority of cast and many members of the crew are deaf or use British Sign Language. The cast is led by Matthew Gurney with Lara Peake, Anne-Marie Duff, Eddie Marsan and Rose Ayling-Ellis. The cast also includes Stephen Collins, Ace Mahbaz, Sophie Leigh Stone, Olive Gray, Sophie Allen, Joe Sims and Julian Peedle-Calloo.

Filming took place in Sheffield in the summer of 2024. Other filming locations included Doncaster.

== Broadcast ==
Reunion was broadcast on BBC iPlayer and BBC One from Monday 7 April 2025.

== Reception ==
Lucy Mangan in The Guardian awarded the show four stars saying that the performances are "uniformly excellent" but that "Gurney is a revelation. He is an effortlessly compelling physical presence, but makes Brennan a mass of delicate layers".

Vicky Jessop, reviewing the series in The London Standard, gave it four stars, praising Gurney's performance as "stunning" and calling the series "a long overdue reckoning of how our system fails the hard of hearing".

Phil Harrison of The Independent also gave it four stars, calling the series "groundbreaking" and mentioning the sound design as an integral element of its success.

The series won for Scripted Casting at the British Academy Television Craft Awards. Ayling-Ellis was nominated for Supporting Actress at the British Academy Television Awards.
