= 13 Little Blue Envelopes =

2005 novel by Maureen Johnson

- Book Cover
- Author: Maureen Johnson
- Language: English
- Genre: Novel
- Publisher: HarperCollins
- Publication date: August 23, 2005
- Publication place: United States
- Media type: Print (Paperback)
- Pages: 317 pp
- ISBN: 0-06-054143-1
- OCLC: 72071892

13 Little Blue Envelopes is a 2005 realistic fiction young adult novel by Maureen Johnson. It tells the story of a young woman who embarks on a journey throughout Europe by following instructions left to her in letters from her aunt.

Published August 23, 2005, it was followed by a sequel, The Last Little Blue Envelope, on April 26, 2011.

== Plot summary ==
Virginia (Ginny) Blackstone, a seventeen-year-old girl who is on summer break before her final year of high school, has received 13 blue envelopes from her self-proclaimed "Runaway Aunt" Peg, who has passed away. Ginny is told that she is about to leave for several weeks and will travel to foreign lands. Her aunt leaves her four rules to follow: she can only bring what fits into a backpack, she cannot bring any kind of journal or foreign language aid, she cannot bring extra money of any kind, and she cannot use or bring anything electronic with her. Ginny is only allowed to open the next envelope once she has reached the destination or has completed the task set in the previous letter.

The envelopes lead her to London, where she meets a "starving" artist/creep named Keith, and Aunt Peg's best friend and roommate, Richard. She realizes she has a crush on Keith, and they go to Scotland to meet her aunt's guru, artist Mari Adams. After she has an argument with Keith, they part ways, though they meet again briefly in Paris. Later, she encounters a horrible hotel in Amsterdam and finds shelter under a very hyperactive family. Following the letters, she goes to Denmark and meets four Australian students, Emmett, Bennett, Nigel, and Carrie. Together they form the "Blue Envelope Gang" and follow the second-to-last envelope to Greece. On the way, the 12th envelope tells her she can open the last one whenever she feels ready.

While in Greece, her backpack is stolen, along with the 13th envelope. She enlists Richard's help to return to England as she discovers her bank card is out of balance. Upon arriving there, Richard tells her that he and Peg were married during her final days with her fatal illness, which makes Richard the uncle-in-law of Ginny, even though they both thought the other was marrying for the insurance for the aunt's illness. This last bit of information completely unsettles the already-distressed girl, who runs to Keith's house for the night. Returning to Richard's apartment the next day, she manages to discover a trove of her aunt's final paintings in the attic of Harrods, a large department store in London, which her aunt used as a private art studio. The painting collection is sold at auction, and the proceeds become her inheritance. While wondering if selling the paintings was the right decision or not, a conversation with Keith makes her realize that Peg wanted Richard to know that she loved him. She writes a letter to her aunt, letting her know that even though she never read the 13th envelope, she knows what it said. Ginny finally makes her way back home to New Jersey, after leaving half the inheritance to Richard.

== Reception ==
Critical reviews for 13 Little Blue Envelopes have been mostly positive. The School Library Journal positively reviewed 13 Little Blue Envelopes, calling it a "quick read" and "the novel drives home the importance of family, love, and the value of connections that you make with people". RT Book Reviews praised Johnson's originality, saying that she "puts an original twist on the genre and leaves some wonderful surprises for the end as well". Booklist wrote that the idea of a young girl traveling alone on an undefined journey "stretches plausibility", but that the book also had "sensitive, authentically portrayed experiences". Publishers Weekly and Kirkus Reviews both positively reviewed the book, with Kirkus calling Johnson's writing "sophisticated and humorous".
