= Retreat (2025 film) =

British thriller film

- Directed by: Ted Evans
- Screenplay by: Ted Evans
- Produced by: Michelle Stein; Jennifer Monks; Alex Usborne
- Starring: Anne Zander; James Boyle; Sophie Leigh Stone; Ace Mahbaz; Anna Seymore
- Production companies: XYZ Films; BBC Film; BFI; Creative UK; The Fold; 104 Films
- Release date: 8 September 2025 (TIFF)
- Country: United Kingdom
- Language: British Sign Language

Retreat is a 2025 British thriller film written and directed by Ted Evans and featuring an all-deaf lead cast.

== Premise ==
A young deaf-man begins to question his place in the isolated all-deaf community he was raised in.

== Cast ==
- Anne Zander
- James Boyle
- Sophie Leigh Stone
- Ace Mahbaz
- Anna Seymore

== Production ==
The film is directed by Ted Evans, who is deaf, and features an all-deaf lead cast. It is loosely-based on a short film of the same name previously directed by Evans, which won awards at the Italian Cinedeaf Film Festival in Rome in December 2013 including Best Director in the fiction category for Evans with Sophie Leigh Stone winning Best Interpretation for her leading role.

It is starring Anne Zander, James Boyle and Sophie Stone, with Ace Mahbaz and Anna Seymore. The film is produced by The Fold and 104 Films with Michelle Stein, Jennifer Monks and Alex Usborne producing and XYZ Films selling worldwide. The film received British Film Institute (BFI) Filmmaking Fund production support in 2024.

Principal photography began in the United Kingdom in October 2024. Filming locations include Wolverhampton.

== Release ==
Retreat premiered at the 2025 Toronto International Film Festival. The film is reported to be released in 2025.
