= Charlotte Arrowsmith =

British actress

Charlotte Arrowsmith is a British actor and theatre director. She is Deaf and uses British Sign Language.

== Personal life ==
Charlotte was born in Croydon to a hearing family. When she was 7, her family settled in Scarborough. Initially she attending a mainstream school with a Hearing Impaired Unit, but when she was 9 years old she started attending St Johns School for the Deaf at Boston Spa as a weekly boarder.

When she was 16, she started attending Doncaster College for the Deaf to study sports and with the intention of becoming a professional coach. She played Basketball for the Deaf Great Britain team (as a re-bounder), with which she took part in the Deaflympics in Rome in 2000.

== Acting career ==
When she turned 19, she enrolled in a BA Hons Theatre, Arts, Education and Deaf studies course at the University of Reading, after which she started a career in acting, centered around theatrical productions.

She was cast as the prophetess Cassandra in Troilus and Cressida (Royal Shakespeare Company), performing in Sign Language or using a creative mix of BSL, 'home' signs, gestures and visual vernacular. Other credits include Moonbird (Handprint Theatre), Midsummer Night's Dream and Love's Labour's Lost (Shakespeare Globe/Deafinitely Theatre) and Great Odds (Mac Arcadian).

More recently, Charlotte was part of the 2019 Royal Shakespeare Company productions of As You Like It as Audrey and The Taming of the Shrew as the servant Curtis, both of which played in Stratford-Upon-Avon, in London and on tour across England. While performing in Sign Language, sometimes she is voiced over by another member of the cast, but sometimes her parts are not translated for the audience. During the run of The Taming of the Shrew, she became the first Deaf actress to understudy for a principal hearing actor, stepping in the main role as Vincentia.

As well as a performer, Charlotte teaches and leads drama workshops with both Deaf and Hearing young people. She cites Ricky Gervais and Brian Duffy as two actors who inspired her.

Charlotte has also performed at music festivals and in music videos as a sign song performer. She has featured on Benjamin Zephaniah's music video 'Touch'.
