= Rose Ayling-Ellis: Old Hands, New Tricks =

British documentary television series

- Presented by: Rose Ayling-Ellis
- Country of origin: United Kingdom
- Original language: English

Production
- Running time: 2 x 1 hour

Original release
- Network: BBC One
- Release: 26 March – 2 April 2025

Rose Ayling-Ellis: Old Hands, New Tricks is a 2025 BBC documentary two-part television series. In it, deaf British actress Rose Ayling-Ellis teaches British sign language (BSL) to people at a retirement home, Hughenden Gardens Retirement Village, in Buckinghamshire. It premiered on BBC One and BBC iplayer on 26 March 2025.

After the first episode was broadcast, some viewers called the series "uplifting" and "amazing". The series has been well-reviewed. Deaf writer and filmmaker Charlie Swinbourne wrote, "It had everything you could hope for: charismatic presenters and relatable, sympathetic contributors,.. and a strong social message – that learning BSL can have a huge benefit for older deafened people". Rebecca Nicholson, writing in The Guardian, gave it 4 out of 5 stars, calling it a "smart, nuanced documentary that blossoms into something profound".

The residents carried on having weekly BSL lessons after the series finished.
