= Feel Good (TV series) =

British comedy-drama television programme

- Genre: Comedy drama
- Created by: Mae Martin; Joe Hampson
- Written by: Mae Martin; Joe Hampson
- Story by: Mae Martin
- Directed by: Ally Pankiw; Luke Snellin
- Starring: Mae Martin; Charlotte Ritchie; Lisa Kudrow; Adrian Lukis; Sophie Thompson; Phil Burgers
- Country of origin: United Kingdom
- Original language: English
- No. of series: 2
- No. of episodes: 12

Production
- Production company: Objective Fiction

Original release
- Network: Channel 4; All 4; Netflix
- Release: 18 March 2020 – 4 June 2021

Feel Good is a British comedy-drama television programme created by Mae Martin and Joe Hampson. It is a semi-autobiographical romantic comedy starring Mae Martin as a fictionalised version of themself (Note: Martin is non-binary and uses they/them pronouns. The fictional character in Feel Good initially uses she/her pronouns and expresses increasing uncertainty over gender as the series progresses. This article uses they/them pronouns for both the person and the fictional character.) and Charlotte Ritchie as Mae's girlfriend, George.

The six-part first series premiered its first episode on Channel 4 in the United Kingdom on 18 March 2020, after which all six episodes were released on All 4. Netflix handled international distribution and released it internationally on 19 March 2020. Independently of Channel 4, Netflix renewed the programme for a second and final series, which was released on 4 June 2021.

== Plot ==
The show follows the development of Mae and George's romance in contemporary Manchester. Mae (Mae Martin), a Canadian comedian (a version of Mae Martin's own personal life), meets George (Charlotte Ritchie), a repressed, middle-class English woman, at the comedy club where Mae performs. The pair begin dating, and George learns that Mae is a former drug addict. George encourages them to attend a Narcotics Anonymous meeting, where Mae meets fellow recovering addicts. Mae's addiction causes problems in their relationship, as does George's reluctance to come out and tell friends and family about her relationship with Mae.

In the second season, Mae's career advances. They address trauma in their past after receiving a diagnosis of post-traumatic stress disorder.

== Cast and characters ==
=== Main ===
- Mae Martin as a fictionalised version of themself
- Charlotte Ritchie as Georgina "George" Lawson, Mae's girlfriend and a secondary school English teacher
- Lisa Kudrow as Linda Martin, Mae's mother

=== Recurring ===
- Phil Burgers as Phil, George's flatmate
- Adrian Lukis as Malcolm Martin, Mae's father
- Pippa Haywood as Felicity Lawson, George's mother
- Ophelia Lovibond (season 1) and Stephanie Leonidas (season 2) as Binky, George's best friend
- Tom Durant Pritchard as Hugh, Binky's husband
- Al Roberts as Jared, an unwelcome love interest of George
- Tobi Bamtefa as Nick, MC of the Gag Bin comedy club
- Jack Barry as Jack, a fellow comedian and Gag Bin regular
- Sophie Thompson as Maggie, Mae's Narcotics Anonymous (NA) self-declared sponsor (season 1)
- Ritu Arya as Lava (who goes by Laura), Maggie's daughter (season 1)
- Ramon Tikaram as David, NA leader (season 1)
- Tom Andrews as Kevin, NA member (season 1)
- Jordan Stephens as Elliott, George's colleague (season 2)
- John Ross Bowie as Scott, Mae's former housemate (season 2)
- Anthony Head as George Lawson, George's father (season 2)
- Steen Raskopoulos as Pete Lewis (season 1 and 2), a Gag Bin comedian

== Episodes ==
Series	Episodes	Originally released
1	6	18 March 2020
2	6	4 June 2021

=== Series 1 (2020) ===
No. overall	No. in series	Title	Directed by	Written by	Original release date
1	1	"Episode 1"	Ally Pankiw	Joe Hampson and Mae Martin	18 March 2020
Mae's comedy club performance has a lukewarm reception, though one audience member—George—seemed to enjoy it. They stay at the Gag Bin, on a date, and kiss, before going back to George's flat. George and Mae have sex and begin a relationship; it is George's first non-heterosexual relationship. Three months later, George has moved in with Mae, but only discovers they are a former narcotics addict when calling Mae's parents. Mae does not want to talk about it, but George encourages them to take up Narcotics Anonymous meetings again. At a meeting, Mae panics and quickly leaves, but Maggie follows them and they go for coffee. Maggie gives them lots of advice and informally becomes their "sponsor", in lieu of Mae attending meetings. George and Mae argue over this; George has searched through Mae's belongings for evidence of their past, while Mae is upset that George will not introduce them to her friends. Mae impulsively burns items from their past. On a night out with friends, George lies that her relationship is with a man. Later, Mae tells George about their cocaine addiction, drug dealing and time in prison.
2	2	"Episode 2"	Ally Pankiw	Joe Hampson and Mae Martin	18 March 2020
George is invited to her cousin Dina's wedding, but lies to Mae that she is not allowed a guest. Mae is worried about being left alone for 36 hours. Arriving, George pretends she is on the phone to a cold caller to avoid introducing Mae to her friend Binky. Mae sends George a flurry of texts and George asks them to stop. To distract themself, Mae turns to Maggie, with whom they drink at an art exhibition. Maggie's daughter – who Maggie was stalking – kicks them out. At the wedding, Binky's partner Hugh proposes, George's mother complains to guests about her recent divorce and George says to the photographer that she is dating a woman. A panicked Mae has locked themself out of George's house, so cannot answer George's calls. George's depressed roommate Phil finds Mae arguing with Nick, the comedy club booker, and defuses the situation. After calling their parents, Mae speaks at Narcotics Anonymous about their relationship being an addiction and Maggie opens up about her daughter.
3	3	"Episode 3"	Ally Pankiw	Joe Hampson and Mae Martin	18 March 2020
Mae leaves an NA session to have sex with George while she is working, but ends up trapped while George teaches. Nick blames their poor performance at the comedy club on them arguing. That evening, George struggles to make Mae orgasm. George tells Binky that she cannot make her boyfriend Jonathan ejaculate, but Binky is unsupportive. Maggie's daughter Laura tracks Mae down and Mae encourages her to speak to her mother. George surprises Mae with a police uniform roleplay, but Mae is insistent that their issue is how they have never met George's friends. George takes Mae to Binky's party – where Mae sees a woman snorting cocaine – but George lies directly about not being in a relationship with Mae. Mae visits Maggie, who is reconnecting with Laura. Meanwhile, hypermasculine men lift George up but drop her onto the glass table, leaving her seriously injured. As Laura is telling Mae that they should not be with George, Mae gets a call from Binky and rushes to the hospital. High on morphine, George apologises to Mae and makes it clear that they are dating in front of her friends. When George is asleep, Mae pockets oxycodone tablets on the drawers.
4	4	"Episode 4"	Ally Pankiw	Joe Hampson and Mae Martin	18 March 2020
George awakens to messages from her friends about her girlfriend and sexuality as Mae discovers their parents Malcolm and Linda are in the UK to scatter their dead cat's ashes. David encourages Mae to make amends with their parents, so Mae and George travel to Blackpool to meet them. Mae apologises formally. While Malcolm and George get on well, Mae tries to talk about issues in their childhood as her mother changes the subject. They scatter the ashes and ride on a Ghost Train. Linda finally talks, blaming Mae for their choices, and telling George that Mae only dates heterosexual women. As George drinks in a gay bar and Linda plays on the arcade, Malcolm talks to Mae about the similarities between them and their mother. George speaks to Mae about their former relationships, worrying Mae will lose interest in her too. Mae says that George makes them feel, finally, restful. The four enjoy breakfast together and bid farewell. Mae and George stay in Blackpool another night and go dancing.
5	5	"Episode 5"	Ally Pankiw	Joe Hampson and Mae Martin	18 March 2020
The comedian Arnie Rivers plays at the Gag Bin; George had a huge crush on him in childhood. At a friends and family NA meeting, Laura presses George on whether she is in her relationship for the long haul. George learns that Binky is pregnant. Mae takes oxycodone after George says she would likely date men only if they broke up. During sex, Mae is preoccupied by their body, gender and what George wants. George discovers the oxycodone. Arnie asks Mae to do a set about their gender and sexuality insecurity, which George turns up to watch. Mae says they might be transgender, that they are trying to be George's dream high school boyfriend and that they are worried George will realise that Mae is a girl. George leaves, upset. Arnie initially asks Mae to tour with him, but when he snorts cocaine and sexually harasses Mae, Nick kicks him out. George confronts Mae about the oxycodone and asks if they makes them happy. Mae says, "not really", and they break up. Mae leaves and knocks on Laura's door.
6	6	"Episode 6"	Ally Pankiw	Joe Hampson and Mae Martin	18 March 2020
Two weeks after their breakup, Mae has sex with Laura for the first time, and Phil buys George pet worms. Mae avoids telling Maggie about having sex with Laura and, at NA, rants about hating the meetings and leaves. Mae gets drunk with Kevin: they get tattoos. Mae headlines at the Gag Bin, as their last set went viral; Maggie confronts them there about Laura and leaves them without a place to stay. Mae steals Nick's cocaine and snorts it with Kevin. After nearly having sex with Mae, he calls his sponsor Brenda and Mae leaves. Mae has an NA meeting with David alone. George invites Mae over for coffee, where she apologises and lets Mae meet her mother, but Mae has already got a flight booked to stay with their parents in Canada. Mae and George have sex.

=== Series 2 (2021) ===
No. overall	No. in series	Title	Directed by	Written by	Original release date
7	1	"Episode 1"	Luke Snellin	Joe Hampson and Mae Martin	4 June 2021
Mae's parents drop them off at rehab; they were last there at the age of 18. Mae's roommate is the obnoxious Marsha, who refers to them as "the Queen of England". The rehab worker Audrey advises Mae to separate themself from George and focus on self-improvement, so Mae calls George and asks to move out. Marsha headbutts Mae after realising they owe them money to Marsha's boyfriend Inkboy. Mae gets panicked after Audrey talks about their teenage years, which they say they cannot remember large parts of. Mae leaves rehab with a comedian friend, Scott, but has a panic attack while doing stand-up. Mae's parents plan to monitor their every movement to prevent further relapse, but Mae leaves to stay with a comedian friend. Meanwhile, George says she will help Phil find his dad, who he has not seen in 30 years. She tells Joyce that she is quitting her job, but changes her mind after speaking to the teacher Elliott. They agree to set up an activist group of teachers, inspired by George's newfound passion for saving bees, and have sex.
8	2	"Episode 2"	Luke Snellin	Joe Hampson and Mae Martin	4 June 2021
Back in England, Mae discovers that Nick has joined the NA programme. The agent Donna Ridley is keen to sign Mae. Mae discovers George is in a relationship with Elliott. To maintain a lie, Mae invites Jack on a double date with George and Elliott. In an escape room, Elliott presses George and Mae on how their relationship ended, and they each blame themselves. George is distraught to learn what Mae has been through since the breakup and they agree to cut off contact, though Mae quickly breaks this with a phone call. While Donna enjoys a stand-up set by Mae, Elliott is concerned when George expresses her desire for more aggressive sex. After breaking up with Elliott, George and Mae re-enact their first night together, beginning at the Gag Bin. Mae fulfils George's desire for dark erotic talk and sex.
9	3	"Episode 3"	Luke Snellin	Joe Hampson and Mae Martin	4 June 2021
George and Mae try various sexual roleplay scenarios. Mae mentions Scott in a nightmare, though they seem to be on good terms when they video call. However, when a woman calls Mae and tells them about a negative experience she had with Scott, Mae drinks a bottle of (alcoholic) mouthwash. At a surprise party for George, her mother suggests she reach out to old friends. George and Mae host a dinner party. Mae begins arguing with Binky, but her water breaks. Phil, though he believes he is about to meet his dad, drives them to the hospital. Mae tries hospital roleplay with George, but she leaves. When Mae is caught inhaling from an oxygen mask, a clinician says they are exhibiting symptoms of post-traumatic stress disorder (PTSD). Binky gives birth to Boothroid and George is the godmother. George suggests sex abstinence for a few weeks; Mae thinks they enjoyed the roleplay as they want to escape from their body. Mae tells George about the PTSD thoughts and the call they received. Their formative relationships were all secretive and with significantly older people, such as when Mae was 15 and Scott was 30. To show intimacy, Mae urinates in front of George.
10	4	"Episode 4"	Luke Snellin	Joe Hampson and Mae Martin	4 June 2021
Speaking to Donna, Mae describes a memory of being chased by a bear, but is unsure if the memory is real. Mae and Jack are invited on a live panel show—Fun Junk—hosted by Arnie. Donna tells Mae to confront Arnie on air about his sexual harassment. George ends the teacher activist group, saying she needs to focus on Mae. Phil turns up to the panel show recording, having spoken to Mae's worried parents. Beforehand, Arnie apologises to Mae. George's homophobic father—also called George—makes a surprise visit and accompanies her on the way to the recording, but gets them lost and crashes. George learns her father is having a son and has an open marriage. They argue, George accusing him of selfishness. Meanwhile, as a producer offers the prospect of continued television opportunities, Mae chooses not to confront Arnie. Donna convinces Jack to but Mae denies the event, fires Donna and unsuccessfully tries to damage Arnie's car. George learns she is not on the guest list for the recording and has an honest conversation with her father that rekindles her desire to save the bees.
11	5	"Episode 5"	Luke Snellin	Joe Hampson and Mae Martin	4 June 2021
Mae imagines reminiscing with Scott and him encouraging them not to talk about what he did. They begin to see Scott whenever they leave the house. In a bad mood, Mae argues with Nick. After performing for two fans who travelled from Norway, Mae begins performing stand-up from their living room. George organises a social justice show for students to perform at. Elliott tells her that she is always supporting Mae rather than the reverse. In an argument, George is dismissive of Mae's PTSD. Phil discovers his father is dead and hosts an intervention for Mae at which Jack, Nick and Pete speak. Mae realises their self-centredness. Mae arrives at George's show to hear her performing a song written by her student Tia, who Mae subsequently depressed. On maliciously given advice from Elliott, Mae makes a dramatic marriage proposal to George in front of the audience. Humiliated, George declines, but rejects Elliott also. George, Mae and Phil pack for a trip to Canada.
12	6	"Episode 6"	Luke Snellin	Joe Hampson and Mae Martin	4 June 2021
At Mae's parents' house, Phil talks about his childhood: his biological father died and Phil pretended to his mother that his stepdad cheated on her. Mae's parents are overbearing, due to Linda's distrust, and try to test Mae's urine for drugs. Mae and George escape their surveillance. Mae encourages George to explore polyamory by kissing a woman in a club and George encourages Mae to consider the label non-binary. Inkboy chases them both over unpaid debt. Stumbling across the house where Mae lived with Scott, Mae recalls more traumatic memories and breaks down crying during sex. Malcolm confesses to breaking and hiding Linda's ornamental pears, which she blamed Mae for. Mae speaks to Scott about their abusive relationship, which he felt entitled to after taking care of them. He has also abused a woman "a little on the young side", and is worried about being "cancelled" after having apologised. Mae and Scott embrace and say they love each other, but Mae says they never want to see Scott again. Phil stays to bond with Mae's parents as Mae and George head north.

== Reception ==
On Rotten Tomatoes, season 1 has an approval rating of 100% based on reviews from 41 critics, with an average rating of 8.3 out of 10.

Caroline Framke of Variety wrote: "Feel Good feels lowkey, insightful and real in a way that so much of TV tries to be, but rarely achieves quite like this – and yes, it also can feel pretty damn good."

At the 2021 RTS Programme Awards, Martin and Hampson won Best Writer – Comedy.
