= Truly Devious =

2018 novel by Maureen Johnson

Truly Devious is a young adult mystery novel written by Maureen Johnson. The novel was published on January 16, 2018, and it is the first in a series of three novels: Truly Devious (2018), The Vanishing Stair (2019), The Hand on the Wall (2020), and the following standalone novels: The Box in the Woods (2021), Nine Liars (2022). The books are published by HarperCollins.

The novel follows teenager Stevie Bell, who attends Ellingham Academy, a private school in Vermont. Ellingham Academy, founded by Albert Ellingham, is infamous for the 1930s kidnapping of the founder's wife and daughter. A mysterious riddle signed “Truly, Devious” was left behind, but the crime remained unsolved. Stevie plans to solve the cold case when she arrives at Ellingham Academy, but Truly Devious seems to return to the school when a new murder takes place.

== Plot ==
The 1936 timeline of the book includes the events that follow the opening of Ellingham Academy. The wealthy Albert Ellingham built his extravagant school, Ellingham Academy, and a home for his family on an isolated Vermont mountain. The school was designed to allow lucky students to pursue their unique interests, and it was built around puzzles and hidden games. In 1936, shortly after the Academy opened, Albert’s wife Iris and their daughter Alice disappeared.

A riddle was delivered to Albert that was assembled using letters cut from magazines and signed “Truly, Devious.” The riddle detailed different ways to murder someone that the mysterious figure seemed to threaten the Ellinghams with. Following the disappearance of his wife and daughter, the kidnapper called Albert with the instructions to bring a sum of money to the nearby island. Albert followed the instructions but never found Iris and Alice. The Truly Devious riddle remained the main clue behind the kidnapping.

On the same day that Iris and Alice disappeared, Dottie Epstein, a student at Ellingham, ran into a mysterious figure in the Academy's observatory dome. Dottie underlined a sentence in the Sherlock Holmes book she was reading to leave behind a clue. She tried to leave, but was murdered by the figure in the observatory.

In the present-day timeline, Stevie Bell begins her first year at Ellingham Academy, and she arrives as an expert on the Ellingham cold case. She is assigned to live in Minerva House on the Ellingham campus with various other first-year students, Janelle Franklin, a cheerful and colorful engineer, and Nate Fisher, a quiet and grumpy writer. Hayes Major, a famous actor known for an online horror series, David Eastman, a mysterious loner, and Ellie Walker, a rebellious artist, are second-year students that also live in Minerva House. The students are warned against entering the abandoned tunnels on the Ellingham campus.

Hayes enlists Stevie to write a script for a movie about the Ellingham mystery that he wants to film in one of the abandoned underground tunnels. In the middle of the night, Stevie sees a foreboding poem similar to the “Truly Devious” riddle briefly projected on her bedroom wall. Stevie, Nate, and Hayes work on Hayes’ movie and Stevie explores the tunnel, which leads to Albert Ellingham’s dome-shaped observatory.

Stevie investigates Hayes’ death in addition to digging into the Ellingham mystery of the past. Stevie discovers that the money that Ellie used to buy her saxophone came from Hayes, because he paid Ellie to write his horror series, which he claimed to have created. Stevie confronts Ellie about her possible motive and involvement in Hayes' death, but Ellie disappears from the house, and is not found when the campus is searched by police. Stevie's investigation of the mystery involving Hayes and Ellie, and the Ellingham case from 1936, continues in the book's sequel.

== Characters ==
=== 1936 timeline ===
- Albert Ellingham: the philanthropic founder of Ellingham Academy.
- Iris Ellingham: the wife of Albert.
- Alice Ellingham: the daughter of Albert and Iris.
- Dottie Epstein: one of the first students at Ellingham Academy.
- George Marsh: Albert's security guard.

=== Present-day timeline ===
- Stevie Bell: the true crime-loving protagonist in her first year at Ellingham Academy.
- Janelle Franklin: one of Stevie’s housemates in Minerva, a crafty engineer who dresses colorfully.
- Nate Fisher: Stevie’s grumpy housemate who is writing his second book.
- David Eastman: a second-year housemate who becomes Stevie’s romantic interest.
- Hayes Major: a self-centered YouTube star and another second-year resident of Minerva.
- Ellie Walker: the eccentric second-year housemate of Stevie with an artistic style.

== Reception ==
Truly Devious is a New York Times Bestseller and the trilogy of novels has received the following awards: Publishers Weekly Best Books of 2018; Chicago Public Library Best of the Best Books 2018, 2019; Goodreads Choice Award Nominee for Young Adult Fiction 2018, 2019, 2020.

== Sequels ==
The Vanishing Stair (2019) is the sequel to Truly Devious.

The Hand on the Wall (2020) is the third book in the series and the final book in the Truly Devious trilogy.

The Box in the Woods (2021) is the first standalone of the Stevie Bell Mysteries.

Nine Liars (2022) is the most recent standalone mystery in the series.

The next book The Velvet Knife (2026) will be released on 29 September 2026.
