= Julian Peedle-Calloo =

British television journalist (born 1977)

- Born: 1977 (age 47–48); Oxfordshire, England
- Occupation(s): Presenter, actor, writer, director

Julian Peedle-Calloo (born 1977) is a British actor, writer, director and television presenter, he has been deaf since birth, and is a presenter of the BBC deaf magazine programme See Hear.

== Personal life ==
Julian Peedle-Calloo was born in Oxfordshire, England, in 1977, and has been deaf since birth. He regards himself as being part of a linguistic minority, rather than identifying his deafness as a disability; British Sign Language is his first language, and English (written and spoken) is his second language. He can hear a little with a hearing aid, but rarely uses one. He graduated from the University of Wolverhampton with a 2:1 degree in electronic media in October 2000.

== Career ==
Peedle-Calloo wrote and directed the 30-minute drama film Battle Lines (2014), about deaf people during the First World War, for online channel BSLZone. His other short films include 5 Needles (2011) and Confession (2012).

He is a presenter on deaf magazine programme See Hear.

As an actor, he has appeared in episodes of New Tricks and Holby City in 2012 and 2015 respectively.

In 2024, he was cast in BBC One series Reunion.
