= Temple (TV series) =

2019–2021 British medical drama TV series

- Genre: Medical drama; Crime drama
- Created by: Mark O'Rowe
- Based on: Valkyrien by Erik Richter Strand
- Starring: Mark Strong; Carice Van Houten; Daniel Mays; Catherine McCormack
- Composer: Matthew Herbert
- Country of origin: United Kingdom
- Original language: English
- No. of series: 2
- No. of episodes: 15

Production
- Executive producers: Liza Marshall; Mark O'Rowe; Mark Strong
- Producer: Barney Reisz
- Running time: 60 minutes
- Production company: Hera Pictures

Original release
- Network: Sky One (series 1); Sky Max (series 2)
- Release: 13 September 2019 – 9 December 2021

Temple is a British medical crime drama television series created by Mark O'Rowe and based on the 2017 Norwegian series Valkyrien. It stars Mark Strong, Carice Van Houten, Daniel Mays, and Catherine McCormack in main roles, and premiered on 13 September 2019 on Sky One. In November 2019, it was renewed for a second series, which premiered on 28 October 2021 on Sky Max, following the shutdown of Sky One.

== Premise ==
In a labyrinth of abandoned service tunnels below Temple Underground Station, Daniel Milton (Mark Strong), a highly respected surgeon, runs an illegal medical clinic that treats criminals and other desperate patients who cannot or will not seek help from regular medical facilities. Daniel sets up the clinic to find a cure for his wife, Beth (Catherine McCormack), who suffers from a terminal illness. Lee (Daniel Mays), a Temple station staff member, and Anna (Carice van Houten), a medical researcher, help him run the clinic. The series focuses on the secrecy, exits and issues of trust as the clinic treats its patients as well as Daniel's need for money to fund his research.

== Cast and characters ==
=== Main ===
- Mark Strong as Daniel Milton, a brilliant surgeon who is willing to provide illegal medical care to fund his covert care of his wife and research into finding a cure for her illness
- Carice van Houten as Anna Willems, a medical researcher and friend of Beth, who had an affair with Daniel in the past and reluctantly assists him with his underground clinic
- Daniel Mays as Lee Simmons, a transport network employee and "doomsday prepper", who helps Daniel establish an illegal underground clinic
- Catherine McCormack as Beth Milton, Daniel's wife and a medical research scientist, who is suffering from a terminal case of Lancaster's Disease
- Lily Newmark as Eve Milton, Daniel and Beth's 19-year-old daughter who is studying at university
- Tobi King Bakare as Jamie Harris, a fugitive bank robber
- Wunmi Mosaku as Mercy King, the mother of bank robber Sebastian King
- Craig Parkinson as Keith Sullivan, a criminal enforcer and ex-lover of Mercy King
- Chloe Pirrie as DI Karen Hall (series 1)
- Ryan McKen as DI (demoted to DS in series 2) Rob Moloney
- Siena Kelly as Michelle Wilson, Jamie's pregnant girlfriend
- Claire Rushbrook as Gloria Wilson, Michelle's mother

=== Recurring ===
- Theo Solomon as Sebastian King, a bank robber
- Kate Dickie as Eleanor, Beth and Anna's boss
- Anamaria Marinca as Suzanna, an employee at Daniel's hospital who becomes one of his patients
- Turlough Convery as Simon Reynolds
- Mark Bazeley as Michael Chander, a fellow doctor and friend of Daniel's
- Sam Hazeldine as Jack Lorean, Anna's boyfriend
- Steffan Rhodri as Jeremy, Lee's manager
- Jan Bijvoet as Clive, a criminal connected to the black market organ trade
- Johann Myers as Nick, a criminal connected to the black market organ trade
- Ruhtxjiaïh Bèllènéa as Ash Falomo, an activist friend of Eve's
- Rhys Ifans as Gubby, a fixer in London's criminal underworld
- Michael Smiley as Dermot, an associate of Gubby
- Michael Akinsulire as Tommy, one of Daniel's patients
- Mandeep Dhillon as DI Kam Skinner, Rob's cousin

=== Guest ===
- Donald Sumpter as George, a clinic patient
- Martin McCann as Cormac, a clinic patient
- Marion Bailey as Ingrid
- Jo Hartley as Professor Kirby

== Episodes ==
Series	Episodes	Originally released		
Series	Episodes	First released	Last released	Network
1	8	13 September 2019	1 November 2019	Sky One
2	7	28 October 2021	9 December 2021	Sky Max

=== Season 1 (2019) ===
No. overall	No. in series	Title	Directed by	Written by	Original release date
1	1	"Episode 1"	Luke Snellin	Mark O'Rowe	13 September 2019
After a robbery job, Jamie is shot by armed police. He calls his friend Lee, who in turn calls Daniel, a surgeon who is attending a service for his wife, Beth, who died by suicide after a long illness. At 'The Clinic', a large rusty high ceilinged chamber with no windows, Daniel removes Jamie's spleen. Flashbacks detail that Beth was a medical researcher trying to find a cure for her disease. Meanwhile, Jamie wakes up and jumps off the operating table but slips on the blood on the floor, knocking himself unconscious. Daniel must operate again but lacks the necessary blood. Daniel calls research assistant Anna, knowing she is an O Negative donor, and lures her to Temple Station. Unwilling to be a live donor, Anna is chloroformed and blood taken from her to save Jamie's life. Daniel walks to another wing where he sits by the bed of another patient with a ventilator: Beth.
2	2	"Episode 2"	Luke Snellin	Mark O'Rowe	20 September 2019
Anna escapes the clinic and Daniel pursues her, terrified she may reveal their location to the police. Flashbacks detail Daniel's encouragement to Beth to pursue the research on their own.
3	3	"Episode 3"	Luke Snellin	Mark O'Rowe	27 September 2019
Anna agrees to help Daniel with research into Beth's condition. Lee brings a violent sociopath into the clinic and endangers everyone.
4	4	"Episode 4"	Shariff Korver	Mark O'Rowe	4 October 2019
Mercy searches for Lee in a bid to find Jamie and exact revenge. Meanwhile, Beth's condition deteriorates.
5	5	"Episode 5"	Shariff Korver	Mark O'Rowe	11 October 2019
Daniel turns to illegal organ harvesters for help in saving Beth. Mercy, thanks to Lee's forced confession, turns her sights on Michelle.
6	6	"Episode 6"	Shariff Korver	Mark O'Rowe	18 October 2019
Tensions rise in the clinic as Daniel begins to give up on saving Beth and Lee faces romantic problems.
7	7	"Episode 7"	Lisa Siwe	Mark O'Rowe	25 October 2019
Deciding to operate on Suzanna, Daniel decides to cross an ethical line to save Beth. Meanwhile, Mercy continues investigating into the missing money.
8	8	"Episode 8"	Lisa Siwe	Mark O'Rowe and DC Moore	1 November 2019
Daniel deals with the consequences of his infidelity as he searches for Anna's breakthrough cure. Hall and Moloney set a trap to arrest Jamie using Michelle's secret phone, while Mercy discovers the clinic and demands Jamie be given up.

=== Season 2 (2021) ===
No. overall	No. in season	Title	Directed by	Written by	Original release date
9	1	"Episode 1"	Christopher Smith	Colette Kane	28 October 2021
Daniel and Beth are forced to conjure up an explanation regarding the seemingly unbelievable miracle of Beth's resurrection; Lee and Jamie don't make matters any easier.
10	2	"Episode 2"	Christopher Smith	Josh Freedman Berthoud and Colette Kane	4 November 2021
New complications arise as Daniel and Lee fall back into old habits to make ends meet; back at home, Beth is surrounded by clues but needs to put the pieces together.
11	3	"Episode 3"	Christopher Smith	Colette Kane	11 November 2021
Daniel and Lee are at their wit's end and bereft of any ideas of how to escape their troubles; Anna must decide whether or not she'll cross a moral line to get what she needs for her trial.
12	4	"Episode 4"	Tinge Krishnan	James Allen and Alan Westaway	18 November 2021
As Anna returns to the bunker for a big undertaking, Daniel is nowhere to be found when she needs him most; Lee finds a new passion in activism.
13	5	"Episode 5"	Frederik Louis Hviid	D.C. Jackson	25 November 2021
Daniel and Anna's reckless behaviors are catching up with them slowly but surely; the police continue to get dangerously close to the truth.
14	6	"Episode 6"	Christopher Smith	Daniel Cullen	2 December 2021
Following recent chaos, Daniel and Anna quickly depart on a road-trip to rid themselves of their recent sins; they meet roadblock after roadblock, leading Daniel into a dire predicament.
15	7	"Episode 7"	Frederik Louis Hviid	Daniel Cullen	9 December 2021
When Eve finds herself in a tough spot with seemingly no escape, Daniel may finally have to come out into the light in order to save her.

== Broadcast ==
The first series premiered on 13 September 2019 on Sky One. The second series premiered on 28 October 2021 on Sky Max.

On 13 February 2020, Temple was picked up by the video on-demand services of U.S. cable provider Charter Communications via its Spectrum Originals banner. The second series was made available in its entirety to Spectrum subscribers on 1 November 2021.

In Canada, the series was acquired by Showcase. The series was also licensed for release on Netflix in 2024.
