= Let It Snow (2019 film) =

2019 American romantic comedy film

Let it Snow
- Official poster
- Directed by: Luke Snellin
- Screenplay by: Laura Solon; Victoria Strouse; Kay Cannon
- Based on: Let It Snow: Three Holiday Romances by John Green; Lauren Myracle; Maureen Johnson
- Produced by: Dylan Clark; Alexa Faigen
- Starring: Isabela Merced; Shameik Moore; Kiernan Shipka; Odeya Rush; Liv Hewson; Mitchell Hope; Jacob Batalon; Joan Cusack
- Cinematography: Jeff Cutter
- Edited by: Evan Henke
- Music by: Keegan DeWitt
- Production company: Dylan Clark Productions
- Distributed by: Netflix
- Release date: November 8, 2019 (United States)
- Running time: 92 minutes
- Country: United States
- Language: English

Let it Snow is a 2019 American Christmas romantic comedy film directed by Luke Snellin from a screenplay by Kay Cannon, Victoria Strouse and Laura Solon, based on the young adult novel of the same name by Maureen Johnson, John Green, and Lauren Myracle.

The film was released on November 8, 2019, by Netflix.

== Plot ==
On Christmas Eve in Laurel, Illinois, Julie Reyes runs into rising pop star Stuart Bale on her train home. He mistakes her for a fan when she tries to return his phone to him, to which she takes offense, despite his apologies. After the train is stopped by snowed-over tracks, Julie gets off to walk home.

Stuart joins Julie, offering lunch at a local diner called Waffle Town. She reluctantly agrees and later has to save him from a group of fangirl cheerleaders. Stuart opens up about how his fame has isolated him during the holidays. Julie reveals she got accepted to Columbia but her mom is also sick from cancer. If she delays leaving, she will lose the scholarship.

They go sledding and meet Julie's mother, Debbie. Going to their house, Stuart is introduced to her grandpa and they bond over Mick Jagger. Everyone dances to one of his songs. While dancing, Debbie has a coughing fit, causing Julie concern.

Stuart offers to get a nurse for her mom, offending Julie. He dismisses her concerns, stating he offered it because he cares about her. They almost kiss before Stuart's publicist shows up to take him back to his hotel. He asks Julie to come with him, but she declines, feeling a need to stay with her mother.

Across town, Waffle Town employee Dorrie tries to juggle her best friend Addie, who is convinced her boyfriend is going to break up with her, and Kerry, a cheerleader Dorrie hooked up with. Kerry visits the diner with her friends and pretends not to know Dorrie; Addie makes a scene with her boyfriend in the diner. Dorrie tries to calm her down, but she storms off.

Later, Dorrie and Kerry meet in the bathroom, kissing passionately. Dorrie tells her coworker Keon that Kerry will probably be at his party. Meanwhile, Tobin plans to tell his best friend, Angie aka 'The Duke', he likes her. They are invited to a party by Duke's friend, JP, whom Tobin sees as competition.

The three steal the keg from the party, ending up in a ditch. Waiting for the tow truck in a nearby church, Duke has Tobin play "Whole of the Moon", but when JP and Duke start dancing together, Tobin leaves. She attempts to talk to him about it, but he brushes her off, angering her.

Tobin's friend Keon attempts to throw a party at his house to impress a big time DJ, but his parents shut down the party attempt and he gets called into work at Waffle Town. His friend and co-worker Billy offers the restaurant as a party spot, provided Keon gets the necessary supplies. Back at home, Julie's mom convinces her to go to Columbia, stating, "When life offers you something special, you take it." Everyone ends up at Keon's party after Tobin arrives with the stolen keg. Duke comes and Tobin confesses his love for her, to which she admits the same.

Addie returns to Waffle Town and apologizes to Dorrie for her rude behavior. Kerry also apologizes to her for being hot and cold, explaining she has not come out yet, then kisses Dorrie in the open, so they begin a relationship. Dorrie and Julie are telling each other about their day when Stuart returns, wanting to see Julie again before he leaves town. They kiss and make plans to meet in New York when she is at Columbia. Keon's party ends up a success, despite the DJ not showing, and they dance all night long.

== Cast ==
- Isabela Merced as Julie Reyes, who has been accepted into Columbia University but isn't sure she can leave her sickly mom to go to college.
- Shameik Moore as Stuart Bale, a pop star passing through town.
- Odeya Rush as Addie, Dorrie's best friend who is paranoid her boyfriend is going to cheat on her.
- Liv Hewson as Dorrie, a waitress at the local Waffle Town. She is unhappy with being ignored by her best friend Addie (who only talks about her boyfriend), and being mocked by Kerry (with whom she has a secret romance) in front of the cheerleaders.
- Mitchell Hope as Tobin, who is secretly in love with his best friend, The Duke.
- Kiernan Shipka as Angie, though everyone just calls her The Duke.
- Matthew Noszka as JP Lapierre, the athletic and sexy friend of Duke's, who is in college.
- Jacob Batalon as Keon, Dorrie's co-worker who is hoping to throw a party in their workplace during the snowstorm.
- Miles Robbins as Billy, an employee at the Waffle Town.
- Joan Cusack as the mysterious Tin Foil Woman, who advises Addie to have more self-esteem and value her friends.
- Anna Akana as Kerry, a closeted cheerleader who frequents Waffle Town; Dorrie's love interest.
- Jon and Jamie Champagne as Chad and Pete Reston, the twins who chase Tobin.
- D'Arcy Carden as Kira, Stuart's publicist.
- Andrea de Oliveira as Debbie, Julie's mother.
- Victor Rivers as Pops, Julie's grandfather.
- Mason Gooding as Jeb, Addie's boyfriend, who rejects her.
- Briar Nolet as Lisa, a member of Kerry's friendship group, who laughs at Dorrie.
- Rodrigo Fernandez-Stoll as Stallholder
- Von Flores as Mr. Bernal

== Production ==
In September 2014, Universal optioned the rights to the fix-up novel Let it Snow: Three Holiday Romances by Maureen Johnson, John Green, and Lauren Myracle. In March 2016, Luke Snellin was announced as the film's director. In December 2018, it was announced that film would be produced and released by Netflix in 2019. In January 2019, Kiernan Shipka, Isabela Merced, Shameik Moore and Odeya Rush were announced as leads, with Jacob Batalon, Miles Robbins, Mitchell Hope, Liv Hewson, Anna Akana, and Joan Cusack also joining the cast of the film.

=== Filming ===
Principal photography began in February 2019 in Toronto and Millbrook, Ontario.

== Release ==
It was released on November 8, 2019.

== Reception ==
On Rotten Tomatoes the film has an approval rating of 85% based on reviews from 26 critics, with an average rating of 5.7/10. The site's consensus reads, "Comfortably cliché, Let it Snow wears its influences on its sleeve, but works anyway thanks to an excellent ensemble and just the right amount of holiday cheer." On Metacritic, it has a weighted average score of 51 out of 100, based on reviews from 5 critics, indicating "mixed or average" reviews.

Noel Murray of the Los Angeles Times wrote: "With its cast of veteran child actors and its baked-in holiday warmth, Let it Snow has some baseline appeal. But like the formulaic Christmas movies that fill the Hallmark Channel this time of year, this film isn’t exactly a timeless classic. It’s more like something to put on in the background, while making cookies or wrapping presents."

== See also ==
- List of Christmas films
