= Maureen Johnson =

American author of young adult fiction (born 1973)

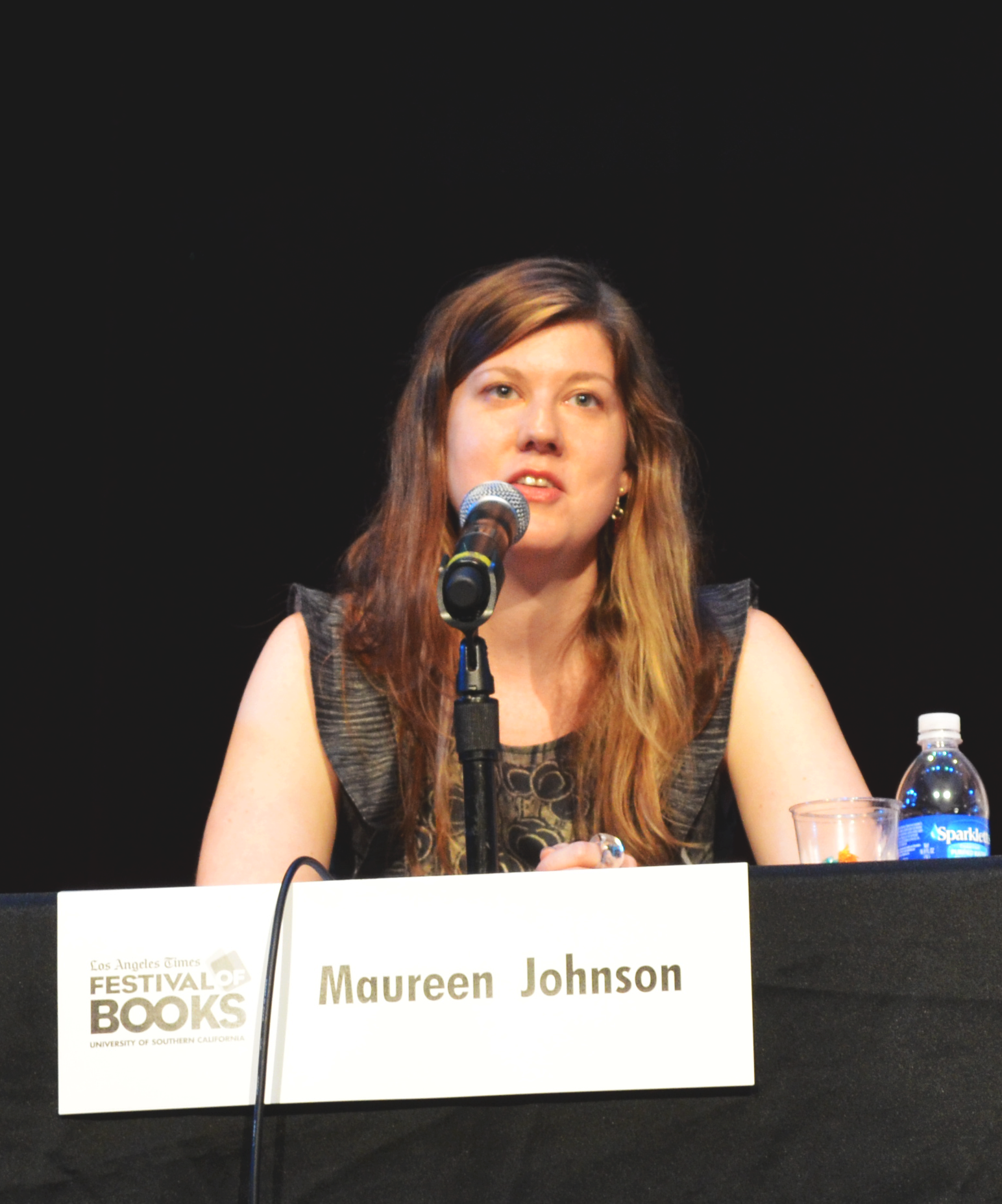
- Johnson at the 2012 Los Angeles Times Festival of Books
- Born: February 16, 1973 (age 53); Philadelphia, Pennsylvania, U.S.
- Education: University of Delaware; Columbia University (MFA)
- Occupation: Novelist
- Writing career
- Period: 2004–present
- Genres: Young adult fiction, Mystery fiction
- Website: www.maureenjohnsonbooks.com

Maureen Johnson (born February 16, 1973) is an American author of young adult fiction. Her published novels include series leading titles such as 13 Little Blue Envelopes, The Name of the Star, Truly Devious, and Suite Scarlett. Among Johnson's works are collaborative efforts such as Let It Snow, a holiday romance novel of interwoven stories co-written with John Green and Lauren Myracle, and a series of novellas found in New York Times bestselling anthologies The Bane Chronicles, Tales from the Shadowhunter Academy, and Ghosts of the Shadow Market.

== Early life and education ==
Johnson was born in Philadelphia and attended an all-girl Catholic preparatory high school. She graduated from the University of Delaware in 1995 with a degree in English. Johnson later worked variously as literary manager of a Philadelphia theater company, a waitress in a theme restaurant, a secretary, a bartender in Piccadilly, and an occasional performer in New York City. She studied both writing and theatrical dramaturgy at Columbia University, where she received her MFA in Writing.

== Literary career ==
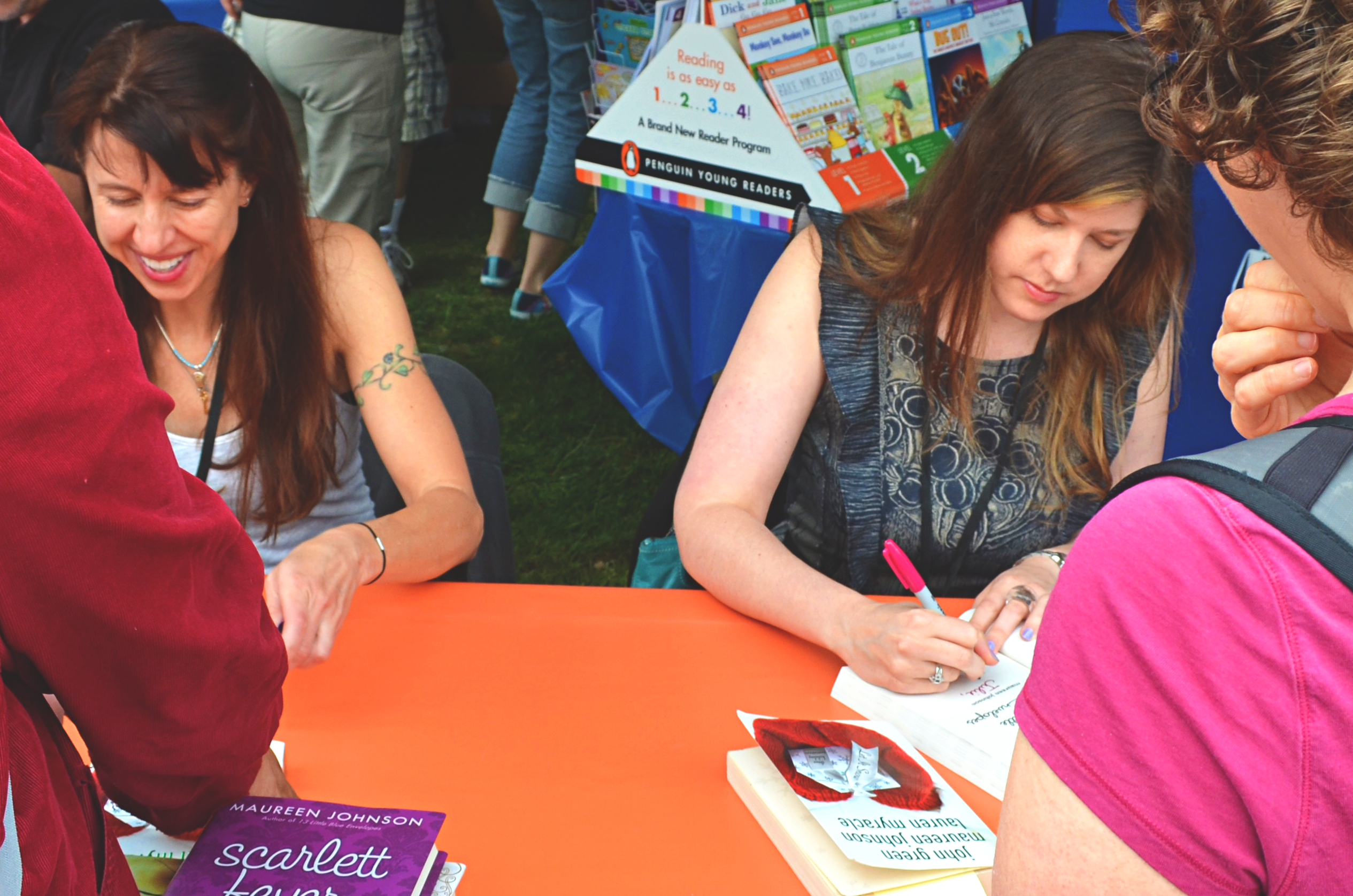
Johnson, at right, along with fellow author Lauren Myracle at left while signing at the LA Times Festival of Books in 2012.

Johnson's debut novel The Key to the Golden Firebird was published in May 2004 by HarperTeen. The Key to the Golden Firebird entered the market during a resurgence of popular interest in the young adult fiction genre. In 2005, it received starred reviews from both School Library Journal and Booklist.

Johnson's second published novel, The Bermudez Triangle (later reissued as On the Count of Three in 2013), was released in October 2004. It was selected as a Winter 2004 Book Sense Pick, as well as listed for New York Public Library's “Books for the Teen Age 2006”, and the American Library Association's Popular Paperbacks for Young Adults, LGBTQ list.

In August 2005, 13 Little Blue Envelopes was published by HarperTeen. Johnson herself has said she considers Ginny's adventure to be "a little bit of a fairy tale," and has cited the song "Charmed Life" by Irish artist Neil Hannon of The Divine Comedy for its likeness to the spirit with which the novel was written. The second novel, The Last Little Blue Envelope, was later published in April 2011.

Devilish, Johnson's fourth novel, was published in September 2006. Marking Johnson's first full departure from contemporary realistic fiction, Devilish was shortlisted in 2007 for the Andre Norton Award, which is for YA science fiction and fantasy novel writing.

Johnson's sixth novel and the beginning of her second series, Suite Scarlett, was published in May 2008. Suite Scarlett was selected by the American Library Association for their list Best Books for Young Adults 2009, and received a starred review by Booklist.

On November 27, 2009, Johnson first became a New York Times bestselling author when Let It Snow: Three Holiday Romances (October 2008, Speak) reached number ten on the Children's Paperback list. A holiday romance novel of interwoven stories co-written with John Green and Lauren Myracle, Let It Snow begins with Johnson's "The Jubilee Express". A Netflix adaptation of the same name was released in 2019.

The Name of the Star, Johnson's tenth novel, was published in September 2011. The first of four titles set within the Shades of London series. In 2012, The Name of the Star was nominated for an Edgar Award in the category of young adult fiction. The second and third Shades novels, The Madness Underneath and The Shadow Cabinet, were published in February 2013 and February 2015, respectively.

Meanwhile in 2011, Johnson became the ongoing lead coordinator of LeakyCon's Lit Track programming, the literary focused experience for fans of young adult fiction more broadly, a production of Mischief Management. Topics of the Lit Track have included the importance of supporting diversity within young adult literature, the experience of writing romance fiction that respects teenaged characters, use of critical thinking in examining the labels we ascribe to particular kinds of fiction, and panels discussing the stories that authors of popular fiction first wrote for themselves in their teenage years.

In March 2014, Johnson was selected to represent the YA category for World Book Day in the United Kingdom with the first publication of her novella The Boy in the Smoke, a prequel story to the Shades of London series. That August, The Boy in the Smoke was additionally released to an international audience for free through the online reading and story writing platform Wattpad.

In November 2014, The Bane Chronicles, an anthology of novellas was released

In November 2016, Tales from the Shadowhunter Academy, an anthology of novellas was released

How I Resist: Activism and Hope for a New Generation (Wednesday Books, 2018) is a collection of essays, songs, illustrations, and interviews on the topics of activism and hope, with all author proceeds donated to support the ACLU.

Truly Devious (Katherine Tegen Books, 2018) is the first in a trilogy of mystery novels to follow Stevie Bell. The second novel, The Vanishing Stair, was published January 2019 and the third and concluding novel of the trilogy, The Hand on the Wall, was published January 2020. A fourth novel, and the series' first standalone title, The Box in the Woods was released in June 2021. A fifth novel, and again a standalone title, Nine Liars was released in December 2022.

== Social media presence, advocacy, and activism ==
Johnson has maintained a personal website about her work and experiences as an author since 2005, with blog entries dating as far back as August of that year. In June 2008, she joined then new micro-blogging platform Twitter as one of its early users, where she has likened her many posts to the habit she had developed of leaving post-it notes around for others to read while working in theater productions.

=== Book banning ===
In June 2007, the parent of a student in Bartlesville, Oklahoma, challenged The Bermudez Triangle's presence within the school. The parent went on record saying "I didn’t appreciate that it was there", referring to the book being in the library. "I just don’t think homosexual materials belong in our schools." While book challenges in the U.S. are not uncommon, Johnson's response upon learning of the issue was to quickly publish a blog post on her website calling for greater transparency in the school system's challenge process. In an attempt to resolve the controversy, the school board did not remove the book but instead placed it in a restricted area of the high school's library. In an interview in January 2008 in retrospect of the situation, Johnson expressed the primary concern that censorship of stories on the basis of a character's identity would adversely affect all children, particularly those who happened to share that given identity. On the school's copy of The Bermudez Triangle ultimately being placed in a restricted area, Johnson stated: "To do so is basically saying to the gay kids, 'There’s something dirty about you.' Anyone who would say that is the true filthmonger."

== Other creative projects ==
=== VlogBrothers ===
In January 2010, Johnson was acknowledged as John Green's secret sister on the popular YouTube channel VlogBrothers. With the reveal of this honorary title, Johnson took on the role of creating videos for the channel during his absence to paternity leave. Johnson later reprised the duty after the birth of Green's second child in 2013.

=== Welcome to Night Vale ===
Since June 2014, Johnson has voiced the character Intern Maureen on the surreal fiction podcast Welcome to Night Vale, as well as occasionally performed the character live on stage. In June 2016, while in conversation at 92Y in New York, co-creator Joseph Fink explained that the character of Intern Maureen was initially written in the image of Johnson, but quickly killed off, as death is a kind of tradition for most interns of the Night Vale Radio station. Johnson, a vocal fan of the podcast, in turn led a Twitter campaign in protest, leading Fink and Cranor to agree to bring the character back on the condition that Johnson perform the role herself. Intern Maureen's continued survival has since become an ongoing joke within the stories. Johnson provided the foreword for The Great Glowing Coils of the Universe (Harper Perennial, 2016), a collected volume of early podcast scripts.

=== Says Who? Podcast ===
Maureen Johnson co-hosts the Says Who? podcast with Dan Sinker. The podcast began in September 2016 as a coping strategy for the 2016 United States election. The original intention was to have a limited 8 episode season with various guests but have continued until the present day.

== Personal life ==
Johnson lives in New York City. A self-described vegetarian since 1994, she has frequently shared her love for both vegan and vegetarian cooking through blog posts and tweets. "I'm a vegetarian from Philadelphia, which means I spend my life trying to make a vegetarian steak sandwich." According to a May 2023 Town Watch episode of Says Who?, shortly after moving to New York City, Johnson got a job as a server in the Jekyll & Hyde Club family of restaurants and pubs.

== Bibliography ==
=== Standalone novels ===
- The Key to the Golden Firebird (May 25, 2004)
- The Bermudez Triangle (October 7, 2004), later reissued in America as On the Count of Three (April 18, 2013)
- Devilish (September 7, 2006)
- Girl at Sea (May 29, 2007)
- Let It Snow: Three Holiday Romances (Co-written with John Green and Lauren Myracle) (October 2, 2008)
- Vacations from Hell (Co-written with Libba Bray, Cassandra Clare, Claudia Gray, and Sarah Mlynowski) (May 26, 2009)
- Cruella: Hello, Cruel Heart (April 6, 2021)
- Your Guide to Not Getting Murdered in a Quaint English Village (Illustrated by Jay Coper) (September 14, 2021)
- Death at Morning House (August 6, 2024)
- You Are the Detective: The Creeping Hand Murder (Illustrated by Jay Coper) (September 16, 2025)

=== Series novels ===
==== 13 Little Blue Envelopes ====
- 13 Little Blue Envelopes (August 23, 2005)
- The Last Little Blue Envelope (April 26, 2011)

==== Suite Scarlett ====
- Suite Scarlett (May 1, 2008)
- Scarlett Fever (February 1, 2010)

==== Shades of London ====
- The Name of the Star (September 29, 2011)
- The Madness Underneath (February 26, 2013)
- The Boy in the Smoke (Prequel novella for World Book Day) (February 24, 2014)
- The Shadow Cabinet (February 10, 2015)

==== Truly Devious ====
- Truly Devious (January 16, 2018)
- The Vanishing Stair (January 22, 2019)
- The Hand on the Wall (January 21, 2020)
- The Box in the Woods (June 15, 2021)
- Nine Liars (2022)
- The Velvet Knife (2026)

=== Anthologized novellas ===
==== The Bane Chronicles ====
Co-written with Cassandra Clare & Sarah Rees Brennan

- The Runaway Queen (May 21, 2013)
- The Rise of the Hotel Dumort (August 20, 2013)
- The Fall of the Hotel Dumort (October 15, 2013)
- The Last Stand of the New York Institute (December 17, 2013)
- The Bane Chronicles (Compiled print edition – November 11, 2014)

==== Tales from the Shadowhunter Academy ====
Co-written with Cassandra Clare, Sarah Rees Brennan & Robin Wasserman

- The Whitechapel Fiend (April 21, 2015)
- The Fiery Trial (September 22, 2015)
- Tales from the Shadowhunter Academy (Compiled print edition – November 15, 2016)

==== Ghosts of the Shadow Market: An Anthology of Tales ====
Co-written with Cassandra Clare, Sarah Rees Brennan, Kelly Link & Robin Wasserman

- Every Exquisite Thing (June 12, 2018)
- A Deeper Love (August 14, 2018)
- Ghosts of the Shadow Market: An Anthology of Tales (Compiled print edition – June 4, 2019)

=== Other publications ===
==== Anthologies edited ====
- How I Resist: Activism and Hope for a New Generation (May 15, 2018)

==== Short stories ====
- "The Law of Suspects" in Vacations From Hell (May 26, 2009)
- "The Children of the Revolution" in Zombies vs. Unicorns (September 21, 2010)

==== Essays ====
- "Hot Sex and Horrific Parenting in His Dark Materials" in The World of the Golden Compass (January 28, 2007)
- "Stupid Monsters and Child Surgeons" in Life Inside My Mind: 31 Authors Share Their Personal Struggles (April 10, 2018)

==== Short works in support of Fandom Forward (e-book only) ====
- "1776: A Story in Tweets" first released to donors of Fandom Forward's Equality FTW campaign (September 9, 2012)
- "A Study in Sink" first released to donors of Fandom Forward's Equality FTW 2013 campaign (February 11, 2014)
- "The Sign of Tree" first released to donors of Fandom Forward's Equality FTW 2014 campaign (February 20, 2015)

== Awards and nominations ==
- 13 Little Blue Envelopes – ALA Teens' Top Ten 2006
- Devilish – 2007 Andre Norton Award nomination
- "Most Interesting Twitter User to Follow" Mashable Open Web Awards 2009
- Ranked as number 15 of TIME's "The 140 Best Twitter Feeds of 2011"
- The Name of the Star – YALSA 2012 Best Fiction for Young Adults
- The Name of the Star - Edgar Award nomination for Young Adult fiction
