= Let It Snow: Three Holiday Romances =

2008 novel by three authors

- Author: John Green, Maureen Johnson, Lauren Myracle
- Language: English
- Genre: Young adult fiction
- Publisher: Speak: The Penguin Group
- Publication date: 2 October 2008
- Publication place: United States
- Media type: Print, e-book
- Pages: 352 pages
- ISBN: 978-0-14-241214-5

Let It Snow: Three Holiday Romances is a fix-up novel comprising three separate stories that intertwine with one another. It was released on 2 October 2008 through Speak. The stories are "The Jubilee Express" by Maureen Johnson, "A Cheertastic Christmas Miracle" by John Green, and "The Patron Saint of Pigs" by Lauren Myracle. The book follows three different teenagers as they experience a huge snow storm in the town of Gracetown during the Christmas season.

== Plot ==
=== The Jubilee Express ===
The story follows teenager Jubilee Dougal living in Richmond, Virginia. She has been forced to spend Christmas Eve away from her boyfriend, Noah, and with her grandparents after her parents are arrested for participating in a riot over a cult-like set of miniature decorative houses – the Flobie Santa Village – with one of the pieces being her namesake, Jubilee Hall.

While on the train ride to her grandparents' place in Florida, Jubilee meets Jeb, who is trying to contact his girlfriend back home but is unable to find cell phone service. She also runs into a group of cheerleaders, whom she attempts to distance herself from due to them annoying her.

She grows further annoyed and exacerbated after the train gets stuck in Gracetown in a large snowstorm on Christmas Eve. While trying to call her boyfriend Noah, she meets Stuart who, feeling sorry for her and her situation, invites her to his house. After dinner, Stuart's mother comments that she hadn't seen Stuart this happy since before he discovered his girlfriend was cheating on him.

Meanwhile, Jubilee continues to tell Stuart about how wonderful Noah is, only to realize that Noah has not contacted her at all that night. She calls Noah and confronts him. When Noah cannot respond to her queries over why he couldn't at least show some concern, she breaks up with him, realizing Noah was not the perfect boyfriend that Jubilee said. Stuart comes to comfort Jubilee and the two kiss.

Feeling guilty, Jubilee tries to sneak out and is discovered by Stuart, who tells her that everything will be okay and not to let Noah walk all over her. Her phone rings with a phone call from Noah, only for Jubilee to toss the phone into the snow and kiss Stuart, after which the two walk back to his home together.

=== A Cheertastic Christmas Miracle ===
The story begins with a boy, Tobin, his friends, the Duke (a tomboyish girl whose real name is Angie), and JP, who are watching movies at Tobin's home while his parents are out of town. They are lured to the local Waffle House by a phone call from their friend Keun, who tells them that a group of cheerleaders has entered the store and are practicing their routines, as well as requesting to play Twister.

Thinking that traveling to the restaurant with the game would be a waste of time, Duke is initially reluctant to go but is persuaded by Tobin, who tells her that there will be hashbrowns. On the way to the Waffle House, the trio's car crashes into a snow bank close to the restaurant, losing a tire. They decide to ditch their car and walk the rest of the way to the Waffle House.

They soon encounter twins Timmy and Tommy Reston in their Ford Mustang, who were also invited to the Waffle House by Keun's friend. A brief misunderstanding erupts between them. Tommy then drives their car towards the Waffle House, only to be rammed by plowed snow in the roadside. The Reston twins attempt to chase the trio on foot, but JP slows them down.

As they escape from the twins, the trio realizes they have accidentally left the Twister game in the car and must go back for it. As they return to collect the game, they encounter the twins again, this time inside their car. Another high-speed chase across town ensues, separating JP from the Duke and Tobin. They all close in on the Waffle House, where JP has miraculously entered and locked the door. He prevents the twins from entering, but allows passage for the Duke and Tobin.

Once inside, they run into another character, Jeb, who is still trying to reach his girlfriend. He asks them if they know anyone by the name of Addie, and Tobin says no. Jeb then asks them that if they do see her to please tell her that he was delayed, saying that she will know what he means.

Tobin attempts to make conversation with one of the cheerleaders, only to notice the Duke is missing. When Tobin finds her at the curb outside the Waffle House, the Duke, clearly upset and sobbing, expresses her sentiment towards Tobin, saying she's jealous about Tobin interacting differently with the cheerleaders and her being treated as a male. Feeling a pang of guilt, Tobin confesses to the Duke about his true feelings for her and the two share a kiss. They become a couple and both of them find out that they love each other.

=== The Patron Saint of Pigs ===
The third story follows a girl named Addie, who is depressed because she broke up with her boyfriend Jeb. The backstory of her relationship with Jeb is told, about how Addie was instantly smitten by him, and Jeb albeit at first shy gradually opened himself to a relationship.

However, as time passed Addie kept trying to change Jeb. This resulted in Jeb feeling inferior and the two fighting. After one fight Addie had gotten drunk and made out with someone else, telling Jeb it was over. Upset, Jeb had taken a train to meet his family on an Indian reservation, unaware that Addie has sent him an email apologizing and hoping to work things out. When he didn't call or respond, Addie assumed that the relationship was over and cut her hair short and dyed it pink as a way to show that she wanted a change.

She calls her friends over to talk, only for them to tell her that she can be self-absorbed and doesn't think of others. Disagreeing, she states that in the morning she will get her friend Tegan's teacup pig while she is on break from work at Starbucks.

The next morning at work Addie ends up getting caught in conversation with a woman who claims to be a "Christmas Angel" and says that people forget to do things for others when they get wrapped up in themselves. This causes her to forget to pick up the pig, who has been adopted by someone else. Upset, Addie manages to get the address of the woman who adopted the pig, who ends up being the woman she spoke to earlier. The woman informs Addie that she took the pig to teach her a lesson and gives Addie the pig.

Addie then returns to work, where she sees Stuart and Jubilee and Tobin and Angie, the couples from the two previous stories. Tobin hears her name, which prompts him to tell her that he had met Jeb and that he had a message from her. After hearing the message Addie's spirits lift and suddenly Jeb walks into the store, having arrived shortly after the others. The two embrace, and then Jeb tells her about the train ride and his attempts to call her. As he tells her about various things he saw on the way, Tobin and the Duke are drawn into the conversation as they recount that they had gone to see them at the Waffle House. Jubilee then realizes how everyone's lives have been brought together and how it has all changed for the better. Addie is so happy that she lets everyone's voices out of her mind and Jeb kisses her.

== Reception ==
Critical reception for Let it Snow has been positive, with the book garnering positive reviews from Kliatt and the Bulletin of the Center for Children's Books. The book was well received by the Young Adult Library Services Association, who placed it on their 2008 list of "Books to Watch Out For". Both reviewers for the Library Journal and the School Library Journal gave Let it Snow a positive review, with the reviewer for the Library Journal writing that "[even] the Grinchiest readers will surrender to the seasonal mayhem."

== Adaptations ==
Let It Snow has been adapted into a film of the same name which was released on 8 November 2019 on Netflix.

== See also ==
- List of Christmas-themed literature
