= Brian Duffy (actor) =

Scottish actor, writer, and artist

Brian Duffy is a Scottish actor, writer and Visual Vernacular artist. He is Deaf and uses British Sign Language.

== Personal life ==
He achieved a BA (Hons) in Video and Film Production from the University of Wolverhampton.

== Career ==
He is credited with co-creating the first sitcom in British Sign Language, called Small World, along with Ace Mahbaz. The comedy series features Visual Vernacular, and relies on physical humour, facial expressions and in-jokes to bring comedy that is effective for a Deaf audience. They created the series directly in Sign Language, filming lines directly in Sign Language rather than writing the script down, and developed the series further with a series of workshops with the actors. He has appeared on short videos.

Duffy has played in many stage adaptations, including Love's Labour's Lost and 4.48 Psychosis with Deafinitely Theatre, and has worked as a Sign Language consultant on Troilus and Cressida with the Royal Shakespeare Company. In 2020 Duffy performed in a theatrical adaptation of a scene from the 1993 Irvine Welsh novel Trainspotting for The National Theatre of Scotland's Scenes for Survival series, Strolling Through the Meadows.

== Advocacy ==
Duffy is an advocate for Deaf persons and Deaf culture. He has endorsed the creation of media that utilizes sign language as well as sign-presented TV, as he feels that "hearing people would understand a lot of deaf people much more if they were to see programmes like that [Small World]". Of the language, Duffy has stated that "Sign language recorded on camera is exactly the same as writing on paper - it is the only way of archiving our language and culture."

== Filmography ==
=== Film ===
- The Guest (2009, short film)
- The End (2011, short film, as Arron - Man)
- Love's Labour's Lost: Performed in British Sign Language (2012, as Boyet)
- You, Me (2012, short film, as Mark)
- Retreat (2013, short film)

=== Television ===
- Wicked (2009, 4 episodes, as Doctor Buff)
- Silent Witness (2015, "Sniper's Nest Pt 1 & 2", as Andrew)
- Small World (2014-2016, as Ryan)
- Small World (2016, TV short, as Ryan)

== Theatre performances ==
- 4.48 Psychosis (2018)
- Strolling Through the Meadows (2020, part of the Scenes for Survival series)
