= Lara Peake =

English actress

- Born: 1997 or 1998 (age 28–29); England
- Occupation: Actress
- Years active: 2014–present

Lara Peake (born 1997 or 1998) is an English actress. On television, she is known for her roles in the Channel 4 series Born to Kill (2017) and the BBC Three series Mood (2022), and Reunion (2025). Her films include How to Talk to Girls at Parties (2017) and How to Have Sex (2023).

== Early life and education ==
Lara Peake was born in 1997 or 1998. She is from Nottingham, England. She has no formal training in acting, never having attended drama school, but joined the Inspire Academy in Nottingham, run by actor Luke Gell.

== Career ==
Peake had her initial breakthrough at the age of 15, when she was cast opposite George MacKay in Duane Hopkins' independent feature film Bypass. This earned her a spot on the 2015 longlist for the British Independent Film Awards "Most Promising Newcomer".

She has a lead role in the 2016 coming-of-age film Spaceship. She appeared in Jo Brand's 2016 comedy vehicle Damned on Channel 4, and appeared in Tracey Ullman's Show on the BBC. She appeared with Nicole Kidman and Elle Fanning in the 2017 feature film How to Talk to Girls at Parties, adapted from a short story by fantasy writer Neil Gaiman. In the same year, she appeared in Channel 4's 2017 four-part psychological thriller series Born to Kill.

Peake appears in Final Score (2018) with Pierce Brosnan and Dave Bautista as a West Ham United fan who encounters terrorists during a match at the Boleyn Ground. In 2020 she appeared in the Netflix series The English Game written by Julian Fellowes, about the birth of professionalism in association football in Victorian England. Also in 2020, she played Madysun in the six-part series Brave New World.

In 2023, Peake appeared in How to Have Sex and was cast in the Disney+ television adaptation of Jilly Cooper's novel Rivals.

In 2025, she learnt British Sign Language in order to take a major role as the protagonist's daughter, Carly, in the BBC miniseries Reunion.

== Filmography ==
Key
†	Denotes productions that have not yet been released

=== Film ===
Year	Title	Role	Notes
2014	Bypass	Helen	
2016	Spaceship	Tegan	
2017	Firecracker	Em	Short film
2017	How to Talk to Girls at Parties	Wainswain	
2017	The Marker	Cristina Vaduva	
2018	Final Score	Danni	
2019	Parasomniac	Lucy	Short film
2021	Broken Shelter	Amelie	Short film
2023	How to Have Sex	Skye	
TBA	† One Hundred and Eighty	Kay	Short film. Completed
TBA	† Dog & Bull	Lenny	Post-production

=== Television ===
Year	Title	Role	Notes
2016	Damned	Chantal	Series 1; episode 4
2017	Tracey Ullman's Show	Daughter	Series 2; episodes 3 & 6
2017	Born to Kill	Chrissy	Mini-series; episodes 1–4
2020	The English Game	Betsy Cronshaw	Mini-series; episodes 2–5
2020	Brave New World	Madysun	Episodes 1–3
2022	Mood	Carly	Mini-series; episodes 1–6
2024	Halo	Fern	Season 2; episode 5: "Aleria"
2024	Rivals	Daysee Butler	Series 1; episodes 1–8
2025	Reunion	Carly	Episodes 1–4
