= Ace Mahbaz =

Deaf actor, writer and filmmaker (born 1986)

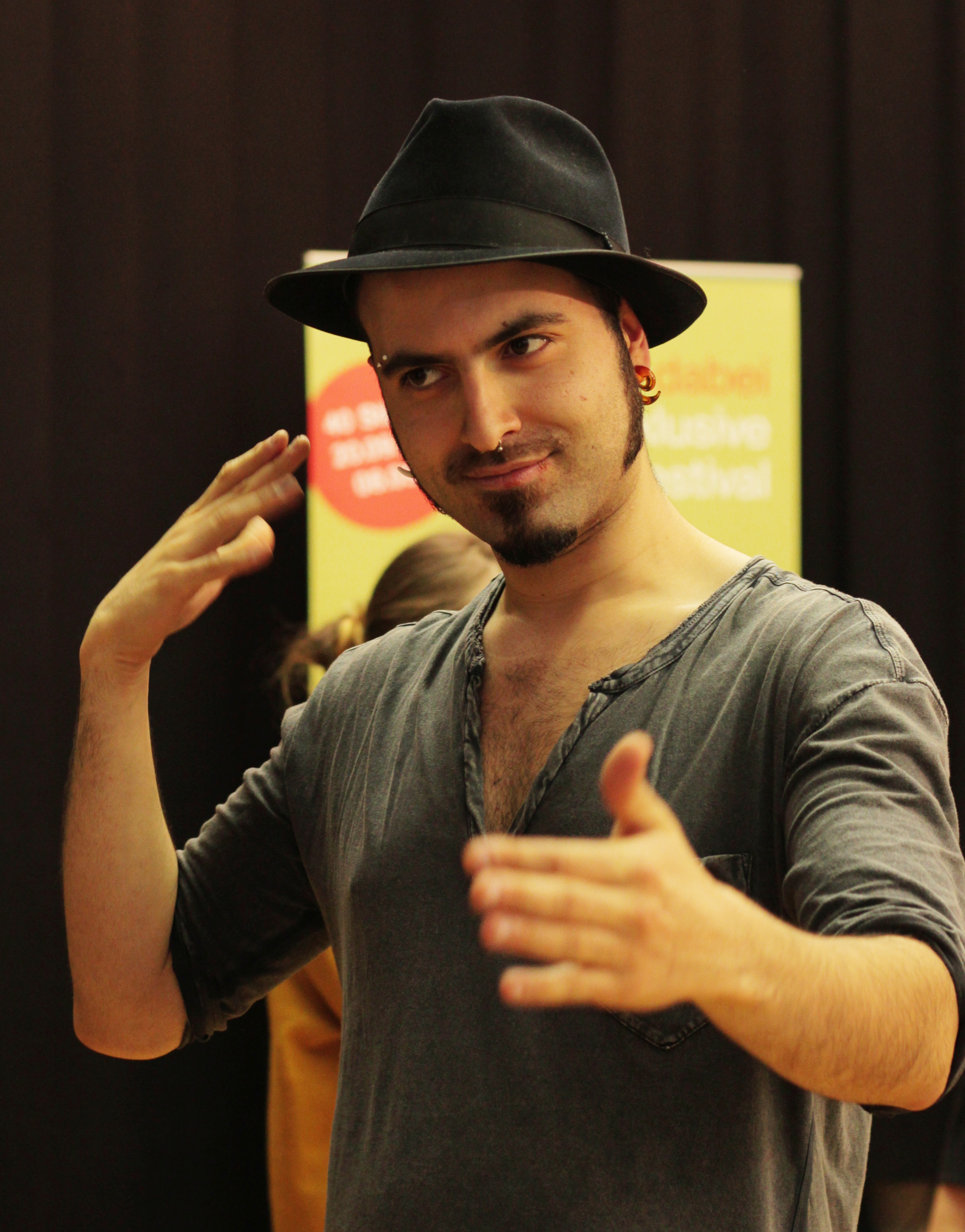
- Mahbaz, 2014
- Born: 25 June 1986 (age 40); Tehran, Iran
- Occupations: Actor, writer, filmmaker

Ace Mahbaz (born 25 June 1986) is a Deaf actor, writer and filmmaker. Born in Tehran and raised in Europe, he is well known as an artist in the Deaf community across Europe, with a long career in theatre performed in several sign languages. More recently he has become known as a screen actor, appearing in the BBC One drama Reunion (2025), and as a filmmaker. He divides his time between London and Berlin, and is fluent in six sign languages.

== Career ==
As a teenager, Ace Mahbaz discovered his passion for performing on stage, which led him to create and perform plays in several European countries during time spent in Germany, Italy and France. He became known for his skill in Visual Vernacular (VV), a visual form of storytelling rooted in Deaf culture that uses the body, facial expression, rhythm and perspective to build a narrative without spoken language. He has used VV to tell stories that are both emotionally powerful and visually striking.

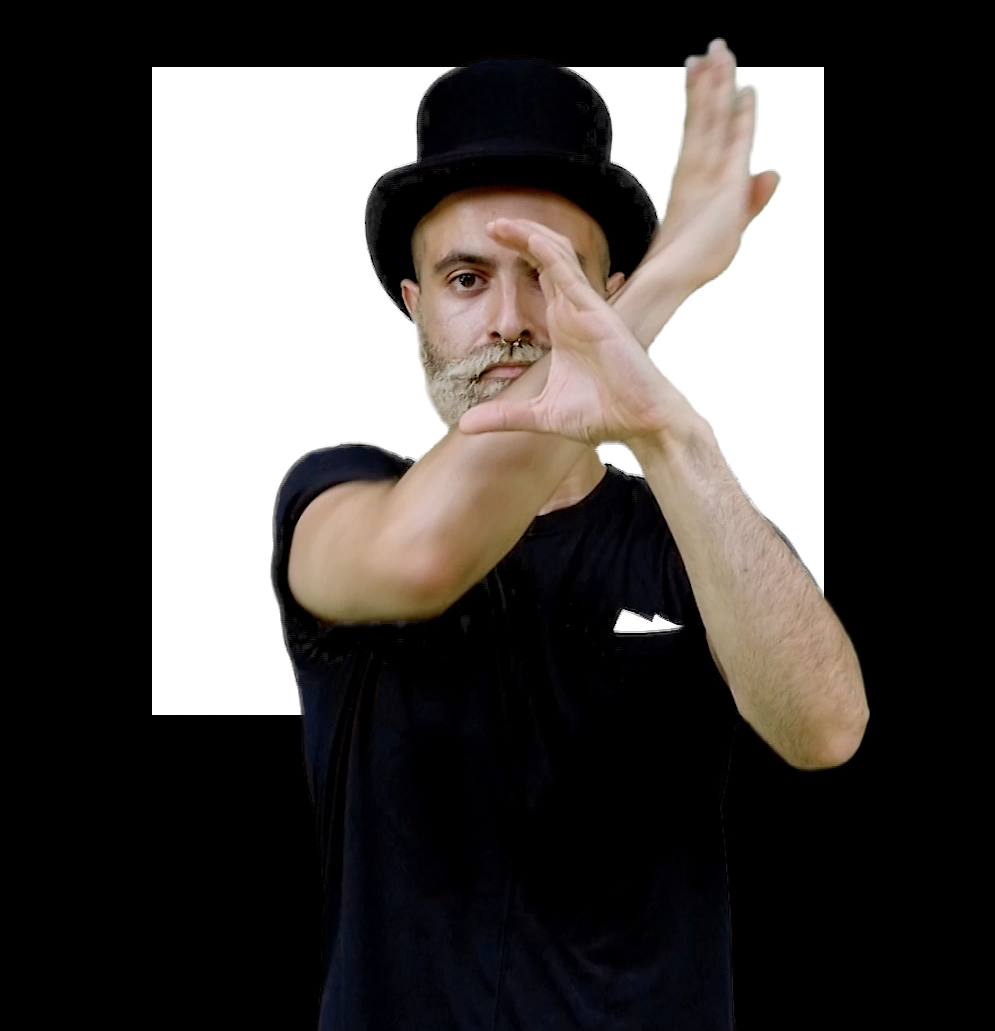
Ace Mahbaz performing Visual Vernacular, 2016

He has since appeared as an actor and performer in various sign languages, including DGS, BSL, LIS, Svenska TS and LSF, at festivals such as Clin d'œil in Reims, France. Ace has won first place in the poetry slam competition (BÄÄM! Der Deaf Slam and Poetry Slam vs. Gebärden Slam) in Berlin twice. He has also acted in various short films and played the roles of Oberon and Theseus in a production of A Midsummer Night's Dream at Shakespeare's Globe.

== Screen work ==
Mahbaz started out in various short films, and has also worked as a sign language and Deaf consultant on film and theatre projects about Deaf people, and on visual work aimed at wider audiences. He later moved into leading mainstream screen roles.

In 2024 Mahbaz was cast in the BBC One series Reunion, a four-part British Sign Language thriller written by William Mager and produced by Warp Films for BBC One and BBC iPlayer. He played Ray Mokhtar; the series was broadcast in April 2025 and is one of the first mainstream dramas to be led by a predominantly Deaf cast and to use sign language throughout.

He is also part of the all-Deaf lead cast of Retreat, a British thriller written and directed by Ted Evans, which premiered at the 2025 Toronto International Film Festival.

== Filmmaking ==
He is a co-creator and actor in the sitcom Small World, and has worked on the television programme Sehen statt Hören, a long-running German television magazine programme for Deaf and hard-of-hearing viewers broadcast by Bayerischer Rundfunk, contributing as a writer, director and presenter.

Mahbaz's debut short film as writer and director, A Familiar Stranger (2025), screened at international film festivals, including the London Short Film Festival and Encounters in Bristol.

== Theatre ==
- Peter Pan (National Swedish Touring Theatre), actor - 2019
- Hem (National Swedish Touring Theatre), actor - 2019
- Festmeny (Teater Manu), Performer - 2015
- A Midsummer Night's Dream (at Shakespeare's Globe) Actor - 2014
- 4Play (Deafinitely theatre) Actor - 2013
- Metroworld (On/OFF Compagnie) Actor, writer - 2011-2014
- Amor Jr. (DAVANTI theatre) Actor, director - 2009-2011
- Il cioccolato (DAVANTI theatre) Actor, director - 2008

== Filmography ==
Film
| Year | Title | Type | Role | Notes |
|---|---|---|---|---|
| 2025 | Retreat | Film | Actor | All-Deaf lead cast; premiered at the 2025 Toronto International Film Festival. Variety |
| 2025 | Reunion | TV series | Ray Mokhtar | Four-part BSL thriller for BBC One / BBC iPlayer. |
| 2021 | One Letter | Shortfilm | Actor | Nominated for The British Short Film Awards 2022 |
| 2016 | Small World | TV series | Writer, actor | World's first sitcom series in sign language, performed entirely in British Sign Language (BSL). IMDb |
| 2015 | Love Is Blind | Shortfilm | Actor | Nominated for Best Short Film at Cannes Film Festival 2015. IMDb |
| 2014 | Battle Lines | Shortfilm | Actor | IMDb |
| 2011 | Red little Riding Hood | Shortfilm | Actor | IMDb |
